This is a list of the bird species recorded in Ecuador including those of the Galápagos Islands. The avifauna of Ecuador has 1656 confirmed species, of which eight are endemic to the mainland and 31 are endemic to the Galápagos. Four have been introduced by humans, 77 are rare or vagrants, and one has been extirpated. An additional 39 species are hypothetical (see below).

Except as an entry is cited otherwise, the list of species is that of the South American Classification Committee (SACC) of the American Ornithological Society. The list's taxonomic treatment (designation and sequence of orders, families, and species) and nomenclature (common and scientific names) are also those of the SACC.

The following tags have been used to highlight certain categories of occurrence.

 (V) Vagrant - a species that rarely or accidentally occurs in Ecuador
 (EG) Endemic - Galápagos - a species endemic to the Galápagos Islands
 (EM) Endemic - mainland - a species endemic to mainland Ecuador
 (I) Introduced - a species introduced to Ecuador as a consequence, direct or indirect, of human actions
 (H) Hypothetical - a species recorded but with "no tangible evidence" according to the SACC

Tinamous
Order: TinamiformesFamily: Tinamidae

The tinamous are one of the most ancient groups of bird. Although they look similar to other ground-dwelling birds like quail and grouse, they have no close relatives and are classified as a single family, Tinamidae, within their own order, the Tinamiformes. They are distantly related to the ratites (order Struthioniformes), that includes the rheas, emu, and kiwis. Seventeen species have been recorded in Ecuador.

Tawny-breasted tinamou, Nothocercus julius
Highland tinamou, Nothocercus bonapartei
Gray tinamou, Tinamus tao
Black tinamou, Tinamus osgoodi
Great tinamou, Tinamus major
White-throated tinamou, Tinamus guttatus
Berlepsch's tinamou, Crypturellus berlepschi
Cinereous tinamou, Crypturellus cinereus
Little tinamou, Crypturellus soui
Brown tinamou, Crypturellus obsoletus
Undulated tinamou, Crypturellus undulatus
Pale-browed tinamou, Crypturellus transfasciatus
Variegated tinamou, Crypturellus variegatus
Bartlett's tinamou, Crypturellus bartletti
Tataupa tinamou, Crypturellus tataupa
Andean tinamou, Nothoprocta pentlandii
Curve-billed tinamou, Nothoprocta curvirostris

Screamers
Order: AnseriformesFamily: Anhimidae

The screamers are a small family of birds related to the ducks. They are large, bulky birds, with a small downy head, long legs, and large feet which are only partially webbed. They have large spurs on their wings which are used in fights over mates and in territorial disputes. One species has been recorded in Ecuador.

Horned screamer, Anhima cornuta

Ducks
Order: AnseriformesFamily: Anatidae

Anatidae includes the ducks and most duck-like waterfowl, such as geese and swans. These birds are adapted to an aquatic existence with webbed feet, flattened bills, and feathers that are excellent at shedding water due to an oily coating. Twenty-one species have been recorded in Ecuador.

Fulvous whistling-duck, Dendrocygna bicolor
Black-bellied whistling-duck, Dendrocygna autumnalis
Orinoco goose, Neochen jubatus
Muscovy duck, Cairina moschata
Comb duck, Sarkidiornis sylvicola
Brazilian teal, Amazonetta brasiliensis (V)
Torrent duck, Merganetta armata
Northern shoveler, Spatula clypeata
Blue-winged teal, Spatula discors
Cinnamon teal, Spatula cyanoptera
American wigeon, Mareca americana (V)
White-cheeked pintail, Anas bahamensis
Northern pintail, Anas acuta (V)
Yellow-billed pintail, Anas georgica
Green-winged teal, Anas crecca (V)
Andean teal, Anas andium
Southern pochard, Netta erythrophthalma
Ring-necked duck, Aythya collaris (V)
Lesser scaup, Aythya affinis
Masked duck, Nomonyx dominicus
Ruddy duck, Oxyura jamaicensis

Guans
Order: GalliformesFamily: Cracidae

The Cracidae are large birds, similar in general appearance to turkeys. The guans and curassows live in trees, but the smaller chachalacas are found in more open scrubby habitats. They are generally dull-plumaged, but the curassows and some guans have colorful facial ornaments. Fourteen species have been recorded in Ecuador.

Sickle-winged guan, Chamaepetes goudotii
Bearded guan, Penelope barbata
Baudo guan, Penelope ortoni
Andean guan, Penelope montagnii
Spix's guan, Penelope jacquacu
Crested guan, Penelope purpurascens
Blue-throated piping-guan, Pipile cumanensis
Wattled guan, Aburria aburri
Rufous-headed chachalaca, Ortalis erythroptera
Speckled chachalaca, Ortalis guttata
Nocturnal curassow, Nothocrax urumutum
Great curassow, Crax rubra
Wattled curassow, Crax globulosa
Salvin's curassow, Mitu salvini

New World quails
Order: GalliformesFamily: Odontophoridae

The New World quails are small, plump terrestrial birds only distantly related to the quails of the Old World, but named for their similar appearance and habits. Six species have been recorded in Ecuador.

Tawny-faced quail, Rhynchortyx cinctus
Marbled wood-quail, Odontophorus gujanensis
Rufous-fronted wood-quail, Odontophorus erythrops
Dark-backed wood-quail, Odontophorus melanonotus
Rufous-breasted wood-quail, Odontophorus speciosus
Starred wood-quail, Odontophorus stellatus

Flamingos
Order: PhoenicopteriformesFamily: Phoenicopteridae

Flamingos filter-feed on shellfish and algae. Their oddly shaped beaks are specially adapted to separate mud and silt from the food they consume and, uniquely, are used upside down. Two species have been recorded in Ecuador.

Chilean flamingo, Phoenicopterus chilensis
American flamingo, Phoenicopterus ruber

Grebes
Order: PodicipediformesFamily: Podicipedidae

Grebes are small to medium-large freshwater diving birds. They have lobed toes and are excellent swimmers and divers. However, they have their feet placed far back on the body, making them quite ungainly on land. Four species have been recorded in Ecuador.

Least grebe, Tachybaptus dominicus
Pied-billed grebe, Podilymbus podiceps
Great grebe, Podiceps major
Silvery grebe, Podiceps occipitalis

Pigeons
Order: ColumbiformesFamily: Columbidae

Pigeons and doves are stout-bodied birds with short necks and short slender bills with a fleshy cere. Twenty-eight species have been recorded in Ecuador.

Rock pigeon, Columba livia (I)
Scaled pigeon, Patagioenas speciosa
Band-tailed pigeon, Patagioenas fasciata
Pale-vented pigeon, Patagioenas cayennensis
Peruvian pigeon, Patagioenas oenops (H)
Plumbeous pigeon, Patagioenas plumbea
Ruddy pigeon, Patagioenas subvinacea
Dusky pigeon, Patagioenas goodsoni
Purple quail-dove, Geotrygon purpurata
Sapphire quail-dove, Geotrygon saphirina
Ruddy quail-dove, Geotrygon montana
Olive-backed quail-dove, Leptotrygon  veraguensis
White-tipped dove, Leptotila verreauxi
Ochre-bellied dove, Leptotila ochraceiventris
Gray-fronted dove, Leptotila rufaxilla
Pallid dove, Leptotila pallida
White-throated quail-dove, Zentrygon  frenata
West Peruvian dove, Zenaida meloda
Galapagos dove, Zenaida galapagoensis (EG)
Eared dove, Zenaida auriculata
Blue ground dove, Claravis pretiosa
Maroon-chested ground dove, Paraclaravis mondetoura
Black-winged ground dove, Metriopelia melanoptera
Common ground dove, Columbina passerina
Plain-breasted ground dove, Columbina minuta
Ruddy ground dove, Columbina talpacoti
Ecuadorian ground dove, Columbina buckleyi
Croaking ground dove, Columbina cruziana

Cuckoos
Order: CuculiformesFamily: Cuculidae

Cuculidae includes cuckoos, roadrunners, and anis. These are birds of variable size with slender bodies, long tails, and strong legs. Eighteen species have been recorded in Ecuador.

Greater ani, Crotophaga major
Smooth-billed ani, Crotophaga ani
Groove-billed ani, Crotophaga sulcirostris
Striped cuckoo, Tapera naevia
Pheasant cuckoo, Dromococcyx phasianellus
Pavonine cuckoo, Dromococcyx pavoninus
Rufous-vented ground-cuckoo, Neomorphus geoffroyi
Banded ground-cuckoo, Neomorphus radiolosus
Red-billed ground-cuckoo, Neomorphus pucheranii (H)
Little cuckoo, Coccycua minuta
Dwarf cuckoo, Coccycua pumila
Squirrel cuckoo, Piaya cayana
Black-bellied cuckoo, Piaya melanogaster
Dark-billed cuckoo, Coccyzus melacoryphus
Yellow-billed cuckoo, Coccyzus americanus
Pearly-breasted cuckoo, Coccyzus euleri
Black-billed cuckoo, Coccyzus erythropthalmus
Gray-capped cuckoo, Coccyzus lansbergi

Oilbird
Order: SteatornithiformesFamily: Steatornithidae

The oilbird is a slim, long-winged bird related to the nightjars. It is nocturnal and a specialist feeder on the fruit of the oil palm.

Oilbird, Steatornis caripensis

Potoos
Order: NyctibiiformesFamily: Nyctibiidae

The potoos (sometimes called poor-me-ones) are large near passerine birds related to the nightjars and frogmouths. They are nocturnal insectivores which lack the bristles around the mouth found in the true nightjars. Five species have been recorded in Ecuador.

Rufous potoo, Phyllaemulor bracteatus
Great potoo, Nyctibius grandis
Long-tailed potoo, Nyctibius aethereus
Common potoo, Nyctibius griseus
Andean potoo, Nyctibius maculosus

Nightjars
Order: CaprimulgiformesFamily: Caprimulgidae

Nightjars are medium-sized nocturnal birds which usually nest on the ground. They have long wings, short legs, and very short bills. Most have small feet, of little use for walking, and long pointed wings. Their soft plumage is camouflaged to resemble bark or leaves. Nineteen species have been recorded in Ecuador.

Nacunda nighthawk, Chordeiles nacunda
Sand-colored nighthawk, Chordeiles rupestris
Lesser nighthawk, Chordeiles acutipennis
Common nighthawk, Chordeiles minor
Short-tailed nighthawk, Lurocalis semitorquatus
Rufous-bellied nighthawk, Lurocalis rufiventris
Band-tailed nighthawk, Nyctiprogne leucopyga
Blackish nightjar, Nyctipolus nigrescens
Band-winged nightjar, Systellura longirostris
Common pauraque, Nyctidromus albicollis
Scrub nightjar, Nyctidromus anthonyi
Swallow-tailed nightjar, Uropsalis segmentata
Lyre-tailed nightjar, Uropsalis lyra
White-tailed nightjar, Hydropsalis cayennensis
Spot-tailed nightjar, Hydropsalis maculicaudus
Ladder-tailed nightjar, Hydropsalis climacocerca
Choco poorwill, Nyctiphrynus rosenbergi
Ocellated poorwill, Nyctiphrynus ocellatus
Rufous nightjar, Antrostomus rufus

Swifts
Order: ApodiformesFamily: Apodidae

Swifts are small birds which spend the majority of their lives flying. These birds have very short legs and never settle voluntarily on the ground, perching instead only on vertical surfaces. Many swifts have long swept-back wings which resemble a crescent or boomerang. Fourteen species have been recorded in Ecuador.

Spot-fronted swift, Cypseloides cherriei
White-chinned swift, Cypseloides cryptus
White-chested swift, Cypseloides lemosi
Chestnut-collared swift, Streptoprocne rutila
White-collared swift, Streptoprocne zonaris
Gray-rumped swift, Chaetura cinereiventris
Band-rumped swift, Chaetura spinicaudus
Pale-rumped swift, Chaetura egregia
Chimney swift, Chaetura pelagica
Chapman's swift, Chaetura chapmani (H)
Short-tailed swift, Chaetura brachyura
White-tipped swift, Aeronautes montivagus
Fork-tailed palm-swift, Tachornis squamata
Lesser swallow-tailed swift, Panyptila cayennensis

Hummingbirds
Order: ApodiformesFamily: Trochilidae

Hummingbirds are small birds capable of hovering in mid-air due to the rapid flapping of their wings. They are the only birds that can fly backwards. One hundred thirty-six species have been recorded in Ecuador.

Fiery topaz, Topaza pyra
White-necked jacobin, Florisuga mellivora
White-tipped sicklebill, Eutoxeres aquila
Buff-tailed sicklebill, Eutoxeres condamini
Bronzy hermit, Glaucis aeneus
Rufous-breasted hermit, Glaucis hirsutus
Band-tailed barbthroat, Threnetes ruckeri
Pale-tailed barbthroat, Threnetes leucurus
Black-throated hermit, Phaethornis atrimentalis
Stripe-throated hermit, Phaethornis striigularis
Gray-chinned hermit, Phaethornis griseogularis
Reddish hermit, Phaethornis ruber
White-bearded hermit, Phaethornis hispidus
White-whiskered hermit, Phaethornis yaruqui
Green hermit, Phaethornis guy
Tawny-bellied hermit, Phaethornis syrmatophorus
Straight-billed hermit, Phaethornis bourcieri
Long-billed hermit, Phaethornis longirostris
Great-billed hermit, Phaethornis malaris
Green-fronted lancebill, Doryfera ludovicae
Blue-fronted lancebill, Doryfera johannae
White-throated daggerbill, Schistes albogularis
Geoffroy's daggerbill, Schistes geoffroyi
Brown violetear, Colibri delphinae
Lesser violetear, Colibri cyanotus
Sparkling violetear, Colibri coruscans
Tooth-billed hummingbird, Androdon aequatorialis
Purple-crowned fairy, Heliothryx barroti
Black-eared fairy, Heliothryx auritus
Green-tailed goldenthroat, Polytmus theresiae (H)
Fiery-tailed awlbill, Avocettula recurvirostris
Black-throated mango, Anthracothorax nigricollis
Amethyst-throated sunangel, Heliangelus amethysticollis
Gorgeted sunangel, Heliangelus strophianus
Tourmaline sunangel, Heliangelus exortis
Little sunangel, Heliangelus micraster
Purple-throated sunangel, Heliangelus viola
Royal sunangel, Heliangelus regalis
Green thorntail, Discosura conversii
Wire-crested thorntail, Discosura popelairii
Black-bellied thorntail, Discosura langsdorffi
Rufous-crested coquette, Lophornis delattrei (H)
Spangled coquette, Lophornis stictolophus
Butterfly coquette, Lophornis verreauxii
Ecuadorian piedtail, Phlogophilus hemileucurus
Speckled hummingbird, Adelomyia melanogenys
Long-tailed sylph, Aglaiocercus kingii
Violet-tailed sylph, Aglaiocercus coelestis
Ecuadorian hillstar, Oreotrochilus chimborazo
Blue-throated hillstar, Oreotrochilus cyanolaemus (EM)
Green-headed hillstar, Oreotrochilus stolzmanni
Mountain avocetbill, Opisthoprora euryptera
Black-tailed trainbearer, Lesbia victoriae
Green-tailed trainbearer, Lesbia nuna
Purple-backed thornbill, Ramphomicron microrhynchum
Rufous-capped thornbill, Chalcostigma ruficeps
Blue-mantled thornbill, Chalcostigma stanleyi
Rainbow-bearded thornbill, Chalcostigma herrani
Tyrian metaltail, Metallura tyrianthina
Viridian metaltail, Metallura williami
Violet-throated metaltail, Metallura baroni (EM)
Neblina metaltail, Metallura odomae
Greenish puffleg, Haplophaedia aureliae
Hoary puffleg, Haplophaedia lugens
Black-breasted puffleg, Eriocnemis nigrivestis (EM)
Glowing puffleg, Eriocnemis vestita
Black-thighed puffleg, Eriocnemis derbyi
Turquoise-throated puffleg, Eriocnemis godini
Sapphire-vented puffleg, Eriocnemis luciani
Golden-breasted puffleg, Eriocnemis mosquera
Emerald-bellied puffleg, Eriocnemis aline
Shining sunbeam, Aglaeactis cupripennis
Bronzy Inca, Coeligena coeligena
Brown Inca, Coeligena wilsoni
Collared Inca, Coeligena torquata
Rainbow starfrontlet, Coeligena iris
Buff-winged starfrontlet, Coeligena lutetiae
Mountain velvetbreast, Lafresnaya lafresnayi
Sword-billed hummingbird, Ensifera ensifera
Great sapphirewing, Pterophanes cyanopterus
Buff-tailed coronet, Boissonneaua flavescens
Chestnut-breasted coronet, Boissonneaua matthewsii
Velvet-purple coronet, Boissonneaua jardini
Booted racket-tail, Ocreatus underwoodii
Rufous-gaped hillstar, Urochroa bougueri
Green-backed hillstar, Urochroa leucura
Purple-bibbed whitetip, Urosticte benjamini
Rufous-vented whitetip, Urosticte ruficrissa
Pink-throated brilliant, Heliodoxa gularis
Black-throated brilliant, Heliodoxa schreibersii
Gould's jewelfront, Heliodoxa aurescens
Fawn-breasted brilliant, Heliodoxa rubinoides
Green-crowned brilliant, Heliodoxa jacula
Empress brilliant, Heliodoxa imperatrix
Violet-fronted brilliant, Heliodoxa leadbeateri
Giant hummingbird, Patagona gigas
Long-billed starthroat, Heliomaster longirostris
Blue-tufted starthroat, Heliomaster furcifer (H)
Purple-collared woodstar, Myrtis fanny
Peruvian sheartail, Thaumastura cora
White-bellied woodstar, Chaetocercus mulsant
Little woodstar, Chaetocercus bombus
Gorgeted woodstar, Chaetocercus heliodor
Esmeraldas woodstar, Chaetocercus berlepschi (EM)
Short-tailed woodstar, Myrmia micrura
Amethyst woodstar, Calliphlox amethystina
Purple-throated woodstar, Philodice mitchellii
Western emerald, Chlorostilbon melanorhynchus
Blue-tailed emerald, Chlorostilbon mellisugus
Violet-headed hummingbird, Klais guimeti
Gray-breasted sabrewing, Campylopterus largipennis
Lazuline sabrewing, Campylopterus falcatus
Napo sabrewing, Campylopterus villaviscensio
White-vented plumeleteer, Chalybura buffonii
Bronze-tailed plumeleteer, Chalybura urochrysia
Crowned woodnymph, Thalurania colombica
Fork-tailed woodnymph, Thalurania furcata
Tumbes hummingbird, Thaumasius baeri
Spot-throated hummingbird, Thaumasius taczanowskii (H)
Many-spotted hummingbird, Taphrospilus hypostictus
Olive-spotted hummingbird, Talaphorus chlorocercus
Rufous-tailed hummingbird, Amazilia tzacatl
Amazilia hummingbird, Amazilis amazilia
Andean emerald, Uranomitra franciae
Golden-tailed sapphire, Chrysuronia oenone
Humboldt's sapphire, Chrysuronia humboldtii
Blue-headed sapphire, Chrysuronia grayi
Glittering-throated emerald, Chionomesa fimbriata
Sapphire-spangled emerald, Chionomesa lactea (H)
Rufous-throated sapphire, Hylocharis sapphirina
Blue-chested hummingbird, Polyerata amabilis
Purple-chested hummingbird, Polyerata rosenbergi
White-chinned sapphire, Chlorestes cyanus
Violet-bellied hummingbird, Chlorestes julie
Blue-chinned sapphire, Chlorestes notata

Hoatzin
Order: OpisthocomiformesFamily: Opisthocomidae

The hoatzin is pheasant-sized, but much slimmer; it has a long tail, long neck, and small head. It has an unfeathered blue face with red eyes, and its head is topped by a spiky crest. It is a weak flier and is found in the swamps of the Amazon and Orinoco rivers.

Hoatzin, Opisthocomus hoazin

Limpkin
Order: GruiformesFamily: Aramidae

The limpkin resembles a large rail. It has drab-brown plumage and a grayer head and neck.

Limpkin, Aramus guarauna

Trumpeters
Order: GruiformesFamily: Psophiidae

The trumpeters are dumpy birds with long necks and legs and chicken-like bills. They are named for the trumpeting call of the males. One species has been recorded in Ecuador.

Gray-winged trumpeter, Psophia crepitans

Rails
Order: GruiformesFamily: Rallidae

Rallidae is a large family of small to medium-sized birds which includes the rails, crakes, coots, and gallinules. Typically they inhabit dense vegetation in damp environments near lakes, swamps, or rivers. In general they are shy and secretive birds, making them difficult to observe. Most species have strong legs and long toes which are well adapted to soft uneven surfaces. They tend to have short, rounded wings and to be weak fliers. Twenty-eight species have been recorded in Ecuador.

Mangrove rail, Rallus longirostris
Virginia rail, Rallus limicola
Purple gallinule, Porphyrio martinica
Azure gallinule, Porphyrio flavirostris
Chestnut-headed crake, Anurolimnas castaneiceps
Russet-crowned crake, Anurolimnas viridis
Black-banded crake, Anurolimnas fasciatus
Rufous-sided crake, Laterallus melanophaius
White-throated crake, Laterallus albigularis
Gray-breasted crake, Laterallus exilis
Galapagos rail, Laterallus spilonota (EG)
Ocellated crake, Micropygia schomburgkii
Ash-throated crake, Mustelirallus albicollis
Colombian crake, Mustelirallus colombianus
Paint-billed crake, Mustelirallus erythrops
Spotted rail, Pardirallus maculatus
Blackish rail, Pardirallus nigricans
Plumbeous rail, Pardirallus sanguinolentus
Uniform crake, Amaurolimnas concolor
Brown wood-rail, Aramides wolfi
Gray-cowled wood-rail, Aramides cajaneus
Rufous-necked wood-rail, Aramides axillaris
Red-winged wood-rail, Aramides calopterus
Yellow-breasted crake, Porzana flaviventer (H)
Sora, Porzana carolina
Common gallinule, Gallinula galeata
American coot, Fulica americana (V)
Slate-colored coot, Fulica ardesiaca

Finfoots
Order: GruiformesFamily: Heliornithidae

Heliornithidae is a small family of tropical birds with webbed lobes on their feet similar to those of grebes and coots. One species has been recorded in Ecuador.

Sungrebe, Heliornis fulica

Plovers
Order: CharadriiformesFamily: Charadriidae

The family Charadriidae includes the plovers, dotterels, and lapwings. They are small to medium-sized birds with compact bodies, short, thick necks, and long, usually pointed, wings. They are found in open country worldwide, mostly in habitats near water. Thirteen species have been recorded in Ecuador.

American golden-plover, Pluvialis dominica
Pacific golden-plover, Pluvialis fulva (V)
Black-bellied plover, Pluvialis squatarola
Tawny-throated dotterel, Oreopholus ruficollis (V)
Pied lapwing, Vanellus cayanus
Southern lapwing, Vanellus chilensis
Andean lapwing, Vanellus resplendens
Killdeer, Charadrius vociferus
Semipalmated plover, Charadrius semipalmatus
Piping plover, Charadrius melodus (V)
Wilson's plover, Charadrius wilsonia
Collared plover, Charadrius collaris
Snowy plover, Charadrius nivosus

Oystercatchers
Order: CharadriiformesFamily: Haematopodidae

The oystercatchers are large and noisy plover-like birds, with strong bills used for smashing or prising open molluscs. Two species have been recorded in Ecuador.

American oystercatcher, Haematopus palliatus
Blackish oystercatcher, Haematopus ater

Avocets and stilts
Order: CharadriiformesFamily: Recurvirostridae

Recurvirostridae is a family of large wading birds which includes the avocets and stilts. The avocets have long legs and long up-curved bills. The stilts have extremely long legs and long, thin, straight bills. Two species have been recorded in Ecuador.

Black-necked stilt, Himantopus mexicanus
American avocet, Recurvirostra americana (V)

Thick-knees
Order: CharadriiformesFamily: Burhinidae

The thick-knees are a group of largely tropical waders in the family Burhinidae. They are found worldwide within the tropical zone, with some species also breeding in temperate Europe and Australia. They are medium to large waders with strong black or yellow-black bills, large yellow eyes, and cryptic plumage. Despite being classed as waders, most species have a preference for arid or semi-arid habitats. One species has been recorded in Ecuador.

Peruvian thick-knee, Burhinus superciliaris

Sandpipers
Order: CharadriiformesFamily: Scolopacidae

Scolopacidae is a large diverse family of small to medium-sized shorebirds including the sandpipers, curlews, godwits, shanks, tattlers, woodcocks, snipes, dowitchers, and phalaropes. The majority of these species eat small invertebrates picked out of the mud or soil. Variation in length of legs and bills enables multiple species to feed in the same habitat, particularly on the coast, without direct competition for food. Thirty-eight species have been recorded in Ecuador.

Upland sandpiper, Bartramia longicauda
Whimbrel, Numenius phaeopus
Long-billed curlew, Numenius americanus (H)
Hudsonian godwit, Limosa haemastica
Marbled godwit, Limosa fedoa (V)
Ruddy turnstone, Arenaria interpres
Red knot, Calidris canutus (V)
Surfbird, Calidris virgata
Ruff, Calidris pugnax (V)
Sharp-tailed sandpiper, Calidris acuminata (H)
Stilt sandpiper, Calidris himantopus
Curlew sandpiper, Calidris ferruginea (V)
Sanderling, Calidris alba
Dunlin, Calidris alpina (V)
Baird's sandpiper, Calidris bairdii
Least sandpiper, Calidris minutilla
White-rumped sandpiper, Calidris fuscicollis
Buff-breasted sandpiper, Calidris subruficollis
Pectoral sandpiper, Calidris melanotos
Semipalmated sandpiper, Calidris pusilla
Western sandpiper, Calidris mauri
Short-billed dowitcher, Limnodromus griseus
Long-billed dowitcher, Limnodromus scolopaceus (V)
Imperial snipe, Gallinago imperialis
Jameson's snipe, Gallinago jamesoni
Noble snipe, Gallinago nobilis
Wilson's snipe, Gallinago delicata (V)
Pantanal snipe, Gallinago paraguaiae (V)
Puna snipe, Gallinago andina (H)
Wilson's phalarope, Phalaropus tricolor
Red-necked phalarope, Phalaropus lobatus
Red phalarope, Phalaropus fulicarius
Spotted sandpiper, Actitis macularia
Solitary sandpiper, Tringa solitaria
Wandering tattler, Tringa incana
Greater yellowlegs, Tringa melanoleuca
Willet, Tringa semipalmata
Lesser yellowlegs, Tringa flavipes

Seedsnipes
Order: CharadriiformesFamily: Thinocoridae

The seedsnipes are a small family of birds that superficially resemble sparrows. They have short legs and long wings and are herbivorous waders. Two species have been recorded in Ecuador.

Rufous-bellied seedsnipe, Attagis gayi
Least seedsnipe, Thinocorus rumicivorus (V)

Jacanas
Order: CharadriiformesFamily: Jacanidae

The jacanas are a family of waders found throughout the tropics. They are identifiable by their huge feet and claws which enable them to walk on floating vegetation in the shallow lakes that are their preferred habitat. One species has been recorded in Ecuador.

Wattled jacana, Jacana jacana

Skuas
Order: CharadriiformesFamily: Stercorariidae

The family Stercorariidae are, in general, medium to large birds, typically with grey or brown plumage, often with white markings on the wings. They nest on the ground in temperate and arctic regions and are long-distance migrants. Five species have been recorded in Ecuador.

Chilean skua, Stercorarius chilensis (H)
South polar skua, Stercorarius maccormicki (H)
Pomarine jaeger, Stercorarius pomarinus (V)
Parasitic jaeger, Stercorarius parasiticus (V)
Long-tailed jaeger, Stercorarius longicaudus (V)

Skimmers
Order: CharadriiformesFamily: Rynchopidae

Skimmers are a small family of tropical tern-like birds. They have an elongated lower mandible which they use to feed by flying low over the water surface and skimming the water for small fish. One species has been recorded in Ecuador.

Black skimmer, Rynchops niger

Gulls
Order: CharadriiformesFamily: Laridae

Laridae is a family of medium to large seabirds and includes gulls, kittiwakes, terns, and skimmers. Gulls are typically gray or white, often with black markings on the head or wings. They have longish bills and webbed feet. Terns are a group of generally medium to large seabirds typically with gray or white plumage, often with black markings on the head. Most terns hunt fish by diving but some pick insects off the surface of fresh water. Terns are generally long-lived birds, with several species known to live in excess 30 years. Thirty-four species of Laridae have been recorded in Ecuador.

Swallow-tailed gull, Creagrus furcatus (essentially EG; a few pairs breed in Colombia)
Sabine's gull, Xema sabini
Bonaparte's gull, Chroicocephalus philadelphia (V)
Andean gull, Chroicocephalus serranus
Gray-hooded gull, Chroicocephalus cirrocephalus
Gray gull, Leucophaeus modestus
Laughing gull, Leucophaeus atricilla
Franklin's gull, Leucophaeus pipixcan
Lava gull, Leucophaeus fuliginosus (EG)
Belcher's gull, Larus belcheri 
Ring-billed gull, Larus delawarensis (V)
California gull, Larus californicus (V)
Kelp gull, Larus dominicanus
Lesser black-backed gull, Larus fuscus (V)
Herring gull, Larus argentatus (V)
Brown noddy, Anous stolidus
Black noddy, Anous minutus (V)
White tern, Gygis alba (H)
Sooty tern, Onychoprion fuscatus
Bridled tern, Onychoprion anaethetus
Least tern, Sternula antillarum (V)
Yellow-billed tern, Sternula superciliaris
Peruvian tern, Sternula lorata
Large-billed tern, Phaetusa simplex
Gull-billed tern, Gelochelidon nilotica
Caspian tern, Hydroprogne caspia (V)
Inca tern, Larosterna inca
Black tern, Chlidonias niger
Common tern, Sterna hirundo
Arctic tern, Sterna paradisaea
South American tern, Sterna hirundinacea
Elegant tern, Thalasseus elegans
Sandwich tern, Thalasseus sandvicensis
Royal tern, Thalasseus maximus

Sunbittern
Order: EurypygiformesFamily: Eurypygidae

The sunbittern is a bittern-like bird of tropical regions of the Americas, and the sole member of the family Eurypygidae (sometimes spelled Eurypigidae) and genus Eurypyga.

Sunbittern, Eurypyga helias

Tropicbirds
Order: PhaethontiformesFamily: Phaethontidae

Tropicbirds are slender white birds of tropical oceans, with exceptionally long central tail feathers. Their heads and long wings have black markings. Two species have been recorded in Ecuador.

Red-billed tropicbird, Phaethon aethereus
Red-tailed tropicbird, Phaethon rubricauda (H)

Penguins
Order: SphenisciformesFamily: Spheniscidae

The penguins are a group of aquatic, flightless birds living almost exclusively in the Southern Hemisphere. Most penguins feed on krill, fish, squid, and other forms of sealife caught while swimming underwater. Two species have been recorded in Ecuador.

Humboldt penguin, Spheniscus humboldti (V)
Galapagos penguin, Spheniscus mendiculus (EG)

Albatrosses
Order: ProcellariiformesFamily: Diomedeidae

The albatrosses are among the largest flying birds, and the great albatrosses from the genus Diomedea have the largest wingspans of any extant birds. Four species have been recorded in Ecuador.

Waved albatross, Phoebastria irrorata
Black-browed albatross, Thalassarche melanophris (V)
Buller's albatross, Thalassarche bulleri (V)
Salvin's albatross, Thalassarche salvini (H)

Southern storm-petrels
Order: ProcellariiformesFamily: Oceanitidae

The storm-petrels are the smallest seabirds, relatives of the petrels, feeding on planktonic crustaceans and small fish picked from the surface, typically while hovering. The flight is fluttering and sometimes bat-like. Until 2018, this family's species were included with the other storm-petrels in family Hydrobatidae. Four species have been recorded in Ecuador.

White-bellied storm-petrel, Fregetta grallaria (V)
Wilson's storm-petrel, Oceanites oceanicus (V)
Elliot's storm-petrel, Oceanites gracilis
White-faced storm-petrel, Pelagodroma marina (V)

Northern storm-petrels
Order: ProcellariiformesFamily: Hydrobatidae

Though the members of this family are similar in many respects to the southern storm-petrels, including their general appearance and habits, there are enough genetic differences to warrant their placement in a separate family. Seven species have been recorded in Ecuador.

Least storm-petrel, Hydrobates microsoma
Wedge-rumped storm-petrel, Hydrobates tethys
Band-rumped storm-petrel, Hydrobates castro
Leach's storm-petrel, Hydrobates leucorhoa (V)
Markham's storm-petrel, Hydrobates markhami (V)
Hornby's storm-petrel, Hydrobates hornbyi (V)
Black storm-petrel, Hydrobates melania (V)

Shearwaters
Order: ProcellariiformesFamily: Procellariidae

The procellariids are the main group of medium-sized "true petrels", characterised by united nostrils with medium septum and a long outer functional primary. Seventeen species have been recorded in Ecuador.

Southern giant-petrel, Macronectes giganteus (V)
Northern giant-petrel, Macronectes halli (H)
Southern fulmar, Fulmarus glacialoides (H)
Cape petrel, Daption capense (V)
Mottled petrel, Pterodroma inexpectata (H)
Galapagos petrel, Pterodroma phaeopygia
Juan Fernandez petrel, Pterodroma externa (H)
Antarctic prion, Pachyptila desolata (V)
White-chinned petrel, Procellaria aequinoctialis (H)
Parkinson's petrel, Procellaria parkinsoni
Wedge-tailed shearwater, Ardenna pacifica (V)
Buller's shearwater, Ardenna bulleri (V)
Sooty shearwater, Ardenna grisea
Pink-footed shearwater, Ardenna creatopus (V)
Flesh-footed shearwater, Ardenna carneipes (H)
Manx shearwater, Puffinus puffinus (V)
Galapagos shearwater, Puffinus subalaris (EG)
Peruvian diving-petrel, Pelecanoides garnotii (V)

Storks
Order: CiconiiformesFamily: Ciconiidae

Storks are large, long-legged, long-necked wading birds with long, stout bills. Storks are mute, but bill-clattering is an important mode of communication at the nest. Their nests can be large and may be reused for many years. Many species are migratory. Two species have been recorded in Ecuador.

Jabiru, Jabiru mycteria (V)
Wood stork, Mycteria americanaFrigatebirds
Order: SuliformesFamily: Fregatidae

Frigatebirds are large seabirds usually found over tropical oceans. They are large, black-and-white, or completely black, with long wings and deeply forked tails. The males have colored inflatable throat pouches. They do not swim or walk and cannot take off from a flat surface. Having the largest wingspan-to-body-weight ratio of any bird, they are essentially aerial, able to stay aloft for more than a week. Two species have been recorded in Ecuador.

Magnificent frigatebird, Fregata magnificensGreat frigatebird, Fregata minorBoobies
Order: SuliformesFamily: Sulidae

The sulids comprise the gannets and boobies. Both groups are medium to large coastal seabirds that plunge-dive for fish. Seven species have been recorded in Ecuador.

Cape gannet, Morus capensis (H)
Blue-footed booby, Sula nebouxiiPeruvian booby, Sula variegataMasked booby, Sula dactylatra (V)
Nazca booby, Sula grantiRed-footed booby, Sula sulaBrown booby, Sula leucogaster (V)

Anhingas
Order: SuliformesFamily: Anhingidae

Anhingas are often called "snake-birds" because of their long thin neck, which gives a snake-like appearance when they swim with their bodies submerged. The males have black and dark-brown plumage, an erectile crest on the nape, and a larger bill than the female. The females have much paler plumage especially on the neck and underparts. The darters have completely webbed feet and their legs are short and set far back on the body. Their plumage is somewhat permeable, like that of cormorants, and they spread their wings to dry after diving. One species has been recorded in Ecuador.

Anhinga, Anhinga anhingaCormorants
Order: SuliformesFamily: Phalacrocoracidae

Phalacrocoracidae is a family of medium to large coastal, fish-eating seabirds that includes cormorants and shags. Plumage coloration varies, with the majority having mainly dark plumage, some species being black-and-white, and a few being colorful. Three species have been recorded in Ecuador.

Flightless cormorant, Phalacrocorax harrisi (EG)
Neotropic cormorant, Phalacrocorax brasilianusGuanay cormorant, Phalacrocorax bougainvilliiPelicans
Order: PelecaniformesFamily: Pelecanidae

Pelicans are large water birds with a distinctive pouch under their beak. As with other members of the order Pelecaniformes, they have webbed feet with four toes. Two species have been recorded in Ecuador.

Brown pelican, Pelecanus occidentalisPeruvian pelican, Pelecanus thagusHerons
Order: PelecaniformesFamily: Ardeidae

The family Ardeidae contains the bitterns, herons, and egrets. Herons and egrets are medium to large wading birds with long necks and legs. Bitterns tend to be shorter-necked and more wary. Members of Ardeidae fly with their necks retracted, unlike other long-necked birds such as storks, ibises, and spoonbills. Twenty-two species have been recorded in Ecuador.

Rufescent tiger-heron, Tigrisoma lineatumFasciated tiger-heron, Tigrisoma fasciatumAgami heron, Agamia agamiBoat-billed heron, Cochlearius cochleariusZigzag heron, Zebrilus undulatusPinnated bittern, Botaurus pinnatusLeast bittern, Ixobrychus exilisStripe-backed bittern, Ixobrychus involucris (H)
Black-crowned night-heron, Nycticorax nycticoraxYellow-crowned night-heron, Nyctanassa violaceaGreen heron, Butorides virescensStriated heron, Butorides striataCattle egret, Bubulcus ibisGreat blue heron, Ardea herodiasCocoi heron, Ardea cocoiGreat egret, Ardea albaWhistling heron, Syrigma sibilatrix (V)
Capped heron, Pilherodius pileatusTricolored heron, Egretta tricolorReddish egret, Egretta rufescens (V)
Snowy egret, Egretta thulaLittle blue heron, Egretta caeruleaIbises
Order: PelecaniformesFamily: Threskiornithidae

Threskiornithidae is a family of large terrestrial and wading birds which includes the ibises and spoonbills. They have long, broad wings with 11 primary and about 20 secondary feathers. They are strong fliers and despite their size and weight, very capable soarers. Eight species have been recorded in Ecuador.

White ibis, Eudocimus albusScarlet ibis, Eudocimus ruberGlossy ibis, Plegadis falcinellusPuna ibis, Plegadis ridgwayi (V)
Green ibis, Mesembrinibis cayennensisBare-faced ibis, Phimosus infuscatusAndean ibis, Theristicus branickiiRoseate spoonbill, Platalea ajajaNew World vultures
Order: CathartiformesFamily: Cathartidae

The New World vultures are not closely related to Old World vultures, but superficially resemble them because of convergent evolution. Like the Old World vultures, they are scavengers. However, unlike Old World vultures, which find carcasses by sight, New World vultures have a good sense of smell with which they locate carrion. Six species have been recorded in Ecuador.

King vulture, Sarcoramphus papaAndean condor, Vultur gryphusBlack vulture, Coragyps atratusTurkey vulture, Cathartes auraLesser yellow-headed vulture, Cathartes burrovianus (V)
Greater yellow-headed vulture, Cathartes melambrotusOsprey
Order: AccipitriformesFamily: Pandionidae

The family Pandionidae contains only one species, the osprey. The osprey is a medium-large raptor which is a specialist fish-eater with a worldwide distribution.

Osprey, Pandion haliaetusHawks
Order: AccipitriformesFamily: Accipitridae

Accipitridae is a family of birds of prey, which includes hawks, eagles, kites, harriers, and Old World vultures. These birds have powerful hooked beaks for tearing flesh from their prey, strong legs, powerful talons, and keen eyesight. Forty-eight species have been recorded in Ecuador.

Pearl kite, Gampsonyx swainsoniiWhite-tailed kite, Elanus leucurusHook-billed kite, Chondrohierax uncinatusGray-headed kite, Leptodon cayanensisSwallow-tailed kite, Elanoides forficatusCrested eagle, Morphnus guianensisHarpy eagle, Harpia harpyjaBlack hawk-eagle, Spizaetus tyrannusBlack-and-white hawk-eagle, Spizaetus melanoleucusOrnate hawk-eagle, Spizaetus ornatusBlack-and-chestnut eagle, Spizaetus isidoriBlack-collared hawk, Busarellus nigricollisSnail kite, Rostrhamus sociabilisSlender-billed kite, Helicolestes hamatusDouble-toothed kite, Harpagus bidentatusRufous-thighed kite, Harpagus diodon (H)
Mississippi kite, Ictinia mississippiensis (H)
Plumbeous kite, Ictinia plumbeaCinereous harrier, Circus cinereusGray-bellied hawk, Accipiter poliogasterSharp-shinned hawk, Accipiter striatusBicolored hawk, Accipiter bicolorTiny hawk, Microspizias superciliosusSemicollared hawk, Microspizias collarisCrane hawk, Geranospiza caerulescensPlumbeous hawk, Cryptoleucopteryx plumbeaSlate-colored hawk, Buteogallus schistaceusCommon black hawk, Buteogallus anthracinusSavanna hawk, Buteogallus meridionalisGreat black hawk, Buteogallus urubitingaSolitary eagle, Buteogallus solitariusBarred hawk, Morphnarchus princepsRoadside hawk, Rupornis magnirostrisHarris's hawk, Parabuteo unicinctusWhite-rumped hawk, Parabuteo leucorrhousVariable hawk, Geranoaetus polyosomaBlack-chested buzzard-eagle, Geranoaetus melanoleucusWhite hawk, Pseudastur albicollisGray-backed hawk, Pseudastur occidentalisSemiplumbeous hawk, Leucopternis semiplumbeusBlack-faced hawk, Leucopternis melanopsGray-lined hawk, Buteo nitidusBroad-winged hawk, Buteo platypterusWhite-throated hawk, Buteo albigulaShort-tailed hawk, Buteo brachyurusSwainson's hawk, Buteo swainsoniGalapagos hawk, Buteo galapagoensis (EG)
Zone-tailed hawk, Buteo albonotatusBarn owls
Order: StrigiformesFamily: Tytonidae

Barn owls are medium to large owls with large heads and characteristic heart-shaped faces. They have long strong legs with powerful talons. One species has been recorded in Ecuador.

Barn owl, Tyto albaOwls
Order: StrigiformesFamily: Strigidae

The typical owls are small to large solitary nocturnal birds of prey. They have large forward-facing eyes and ears, a hawk-like beak, and a conspicuous circle of feathers around each eye called a facial disk. Twenty-nine species have been recorded in Ecuador.

White-throated screech-owl, Megascops albogularisTropical screech-owl, Megascops cholibaKoepcke's screech-owl, Megascops koepckeaeRufescent screech-owl, Megascops ingensCinnamon screech-owl, Megascops petersoniChoco screech-owl, Megascops centralisFoothill screech-owl, Megascops roraimaePeruvian screech-owl, Megascops roboratusTawny-bellied screech-owl, Megascops watsoniiCrested owl, Lophostrix cristataSpectacled owl, Pulsatrix perspicillataBand-bellied owl, Pulsatrix melanotaGreat horned owl, Bubo virginianusMottled owl, Strix virgataBlack-and-white owl, Strix nigrolineataBlack-banded owl, Strix huhulaRufous-banded owl, Strix albitarsisCloud-forest pygmy-owl, Glaucidium nubicolaAndean pygmy-owl, Glaucidium jardiniiSubtropical pygmy-owl, Glaucidium parkeriCentral American pygmy-owl, Glaucidium griseicepsFerruginous pygmy-owl, Glaucidium brasilianumPeruvian pygmy-owl, Glaucidium peruanumBurrowing owl, Athene cuniculariaBuff-fronted owl, Aegolius harrisiiStriped owl, Asio clamatorStygian owl, Asio stygiusShort-eared owl, Asio flammeusTrogons
Order: TrogoniformesFamily: Trogonidae

The family Trogonidae includes trogons and quetzals. Found in tropical woodlands worldwide, they feed on insects and fruit, and their broad bills and weak legs reflect their diet and arboreal habits. Although their flight is fast, they are reluctant to fly any distance. Trogons have soft, often colorful, feathers with distinctive male and female plumage. Fifteen species have been recorded in Ecuador.

Pavonine quetzal, Pharomachrus pavoninusGolden-headed quetzal, Pharomachrus auricepsCrested quetzal, Pharomachrus antisianusSlaty-tailed trogon, Trogon massenaBlue-tailed trogon, Trogon comptusEcuadorian trogon, Trogon mesurusBlack-tailed trogon, Trogon melanurusWhite-tailed trogon, Trogon chionurusGreen-backed trogon, Trogon viridisGartered trogon, Trogon caligatusAmazonian trogon, Trogon ramonianusBlue-crowned trogon, Trogon curucuiBlack-throated trogon, Trogon rufus (see note)
Collared trogon, Trogon collarisMasked trogon, Trogon personatusMotmots
Order: CoraciiformesFamily: Momotidae

The motmots have colorful plumage and long, graduated tails which they display by waggling back and forth. In most of the species, the barbs near the ends of the two longest (central) tail feathers are weak and fall off, leaving a length of bare shaft and creating a racket-shaped tail. Five species have been recorded in Ecuador.

Broad-billed motmot, Electron platyrhynchumRufous motmot, Baryphthengus martiiWhooping motmot, Momotus subrufescensAmazonian motmot, Momotus momotaAndean motmot, Momotus aequatorialisKingfishers
Order: CoraciiformesFamily: Alcedinidae

Kingfishers are medium-sized birds with large heads, long pointed bills, short legs, and stubby tails. Six species have been recorded in Ecuador.

Ringed kingfisher, Megaceryle torquatusBelted kingfisher, Megaceryle alcyon (V)
Amazon kingfisher, Chloroceryle amazonaAmerican pygmy kingfisher, Chloroceryle aeneaGreen kingfisher, Chloroceryle americanaGreen-and-rufous kingfisher, Chloroceryle indaJacamars
Order: GalbuliformesFamily: Galbulidae

The jacamars are near passerine birds from tropical South America with a range that extends up to Mexico. They feed on insects caught on the wing, and are glossy, elegant birds with long bills and tails. In appearance and behavior they resemble the Old World bee-eaters, although they are more closely related to puffbirds. Ten species have been recorded in Ecuador.

White-eared jacamar, Galbalcyrhynchus leucotisBrown jacamar, Brachygalba lugubrisYellow-billed jacamar, Galbula albirostrisRufous-tailed jacamar, Galbula ruficaudaWhite-chinned jacamar, Galbula tombaceaBluish-fronted jacamar, Galbula cyanescensCoppery-chested jacamar, Galbula pastazaePurplish jacamar, Galbula chalcothoraxParadise jacamar, Galbula deaGreat jacamar, Jacamerops aureusPuffbirds
Order: GalbuliformesFamily: Bucconidae

The puffbirds are related to the jacamars and have the same range, but lack the iridescent colors of that family. They are mainly brown, rufous, or gray, with large heads and flattened bills with hooked tips. The loose abundant plumage and short tails makes them look stout and puffy, giving rise to the English common name of the family. Twenty species have been recorded in Ecuador.

White-necked puffbird, Notharchus hyperrhynchusBlack-breasted puffbird, Notharchus pectoralisPied puffbird, Notharchus tectusChestnut-capped puffbird, Bucco macrodactylusSpotted puffbird, Bucco tamatiaCollared puffbird, Bucco capensisBarred puffbird, Nystalus radiatusWestern striolated-puffbird, Nystalus obamaiWhite-chested puffbird, Malacoptila fuscaWhite-whiskered puffbird, Malacoptila panamensisBlack-streaked puffbird, Malacoptila fulvogularisMoustached puffbird, Malacoptila mystacalisLanceolated monklet, Micromonacha lanceolataRusty-breasted nunlet, Nonnula rubeculaBrown nunlet, Nonnula brunneaWhite-faced nunbird, Hapaloptila castaneaBlack-fronted nunbird, Monasa nigrifronsWhite-fronted nunbird, Monasa morphoeusYellow-billed nunbird, Monasa flavirostrisSwallow-winged puffbird, Chelidoptera tenebrosaNew World barbets
Order: PiciformesFamily: Capitonidae

The barbets are plump birds, with short necks and large heads. They get their name from the bristles which fringe their heavy bills. Most species are brightly colored. Six species have been recorded in Ecuador.

Scarlet-crowned barbet, Capito aurovirensOrange-fronted barbet, Capito squamatusFive-colored barbet, Capito quinticolorGilded barbet, Capito auratusLemon-throated barbet, Eubucco richardsoniRed-headed barbet, Eubucco bourcieriiToucan-barbets
Order: PiciformesFamily: Semnornithidae

The toucan-barbets are birds of montane forests in the Neotropics. They are highly social and non-migratory.

Toucan barbet, Semnornis ramphastinusToucans
Order: PiciformesFamily: Ramphastidae

Toucans are near passerine birds from the Neotropics. They are brightly marked and have enormous, colorful bills which in some species amount to half their body length. Seventeen species have been recorded in Ecuador.

Yellow-throated toucan, Ramphastos ambiguusWhite-throated toucan, Ramphastos tucanusChoco toucan, Ramphastos brevisChannel-billed toucan, Ramphastos vitellinusSouthern emerald-toucanet, Aulacorhynchus albivittaChestnut-tipped toucanet, Aulacorhynchus derbianusCrimson-rumped toucanet, Aulacorhynchus haematopygusGray-breasted mountain-toucan, Andigena hypoglaucaPlate-billed mountain-toucan, Andigena laminirostrisBlack-billed mountain-toucan, Andigena nigrirostrisYellow-eared toucanet, Selenidera spectabilisGolden-collared toucanet, Selenidera reinwardtiiLettered aracari, Pteroglossus inscriptusCollared aracari, Pteroglossus torquatusChestnut-eared aracari, Pteroglossus castanotisMany-banded aracari, Pteroglossus pluricinctusIvory-billed aracari, Pteroglossus azaraWoodpeckers
Order: PiciformesFamily: Picidae

Woodpeckers are small to medium-sized birds with chisel-like beaks, short legs, stiff tails, and long tongues used for capturing insects. Some species have feet with two toes pointing forward and two backward, while several species have only three toes. Many woodpeckers have the habit of tapping noisily on tree trunks with their beaks. Thirty-four species have been recorded in Ecuador.

Lafresnaye's piculet, Picumnus lafresnayiEcuadorian piculet, Picumnus sclateriRufous-breasted piculet, Picumnus rufiventrisOlivaceous piculet, Picumnus olivaceusYellow-tufted woodpecker, Melanerpes cruentatusBlack-cheeked woodpecker, Melanerpes pucheraniSmoky-brown woodpecker, Dryobates fumigatusRed-rumped woodpecker, Dryobates kirkiiLittle woodpecker, Dryobates passerinusScarlet-backed woodpecker, Dryobates callonotusYellow-vented woodpecker, Dryobates dignusBar-bellied woodpecker, Dryobates nigricepsRed-stained woodpecker, Dryobates affinisChoco woodpecker, Dryobates chocoensisPowerful woodpecker, Campephilus pollensCrimson-bellied woodpecker, Campephilus haematogasterRed-necked woodpecker, Campephilus rubricollisCrimson-crested woodpecker, Campephilus melanoleucosGuayaquil woodpecker, Campephilus gayaquilensisLineated woodpecker, Dryocopus lineatusCinnamon woodpecker, Celeus loricatusRinged woodpecker, Celeus torquatusScale-breasted woodpecker, Celeus grammicusCream-colored woodpecker, Celeus flavusRufous-headed woodpecker, Celeus spectabilisChestnut woodpecker, Celeus elegansWhite-throated woodpecker, Piculus leucolaemusLita woodpecker, Piculus litaeYellow-throated woodpecker, Piculus flavigulaGolden-green woodpecker, Piculus chrysochlorosGolden-olive woodpecker, Colaptes rubiginosusCrimson-mantled woodpecker, Colaptes rivoliiSpot-breasted woodpecker, Colaptes punctigulaAndean flicker, Colaptes rupicolaFalcons
Order: FalconiformesFamily: Falconidae

Falconidae is a family of diurnal birds of prey. They differ from hawks, eagles, and kites in that they kill with their beaks instead of their talons. Nineteen species have been recorded in Ecuador.

Laughing falcon, Herpetotheres cachinnansBarred forest-falcon, Micrastur ruficollisPlumbeous forest-falcon, Micrastur plumbeusLined forest-falcon, Micrastur gilvicollisSlaty-backed forest-falcon, Micrastur mirandolleiCollared forest-falcon, Micrastur semitorquatusBuckley's forest-falcon, Micrastur buckleyiCrested caracara, Caracara plancusRed-throated caracara, Ibycter americanusCarunculated caracara, Phalcoboenus carunculatusMountain caracara, Phalcoboenus megalopterusBlack caracara, Daptrius aterYellow-headed caracara, Milvago chimachimaAmerican kestrel, Falco sparveriusMerlin, Falco columbariusBat falcon, Falco rufigularisOrange-breasted falcon, Falco deiroleucusAplomado falcon, Falco femoralisPeregrine falcon, Falco peregrinusNew World and African parrots
Order: PsittaciformesFamily: Psittacidae

Parrots are small to large birds with a characteristic curved beak. Their upper mandibles have slight mobility in the joint with the skull and they have a generally erect stance. All parrots are zygodactyl, having the four toes on each foot placed two at the front and two to the back. Forty-six species have been recorded in Ecuador.

Scarlet-shouldered parrotlet, Touit huetiiBlue-fronted parrotlet, Touit dilectissimusSapphire-rumped parrotlet, Touit purpuratusSpot-winged parrotlet, Touit stictopterusBarred parakeet, Bolborhynchus lineolaTui parakeet, Brotogeris sanctithomae (H)
Canary-winged parakeet, Brotogeris versicolurus (I)
Gray-cheeked parakeet, Brotogeris pyrrhopteraCobalt-winged parakeet, Brotogeris cyanopteraRusty-faced parrot, Hapalopsittaca amazonina (H)
Red-faced parrot, Hapalopsittaca pyrrhopsRose-faced parrot, Pyrilia pulchraOrange-cheeked parrot, Pyrilia barrabandiRed-billed parrot, Pionus sordidusSpeckle-faced parrot, Pionus tumultuosusBlue-headed parrot, Pionus menstruusBronze-winged parrot, Pionus chalcopterusShort-tailed parrot, Graydidascalus brachyurusFestive parrot, Amazona festivaRed-lored parrot, Amazona autumnalisYellow-crowned parrot, Amazona ochrocephalaMealy parrot, Amazona farinosaOrange-winged parrot, Amazona amazonicaScaly-naped parrot, Amazona mercenariusDusky-billed parrotlet, Forpus modestusRiparian parrotlet, Forpus crassirostrisPacific parrotlet, Forpus coelestisBlack-headed parrot, Pionites melanocephalusRed-fan parrot, Deroptyus accipitrinusRose-fronted parakeet, Pyrrhura roseifronsMaroon-tailed parakeet, Pyrrhura melanuraEl Oro parakeet, Pyrrhura orcesi (EM)
White-necked parakeet, Pyrrhura albipectus (EM)
Dusky-headed parakeet, Aratinga weddelliiRed-bellied macaw, Orthopsittaca manilatusBlue-and-yellow macaw, Ara araraunaChestnut-fronted macaw, Ara severusMilitary macaw, Ara militarisGreat green macaw, Ara ambiguusScarlet macaw, Ara macaoRed-and-green macaw, Ara chloropterusGolden-plumed parakeet, Leptosittaca branickiiYellow-eared parrot, Ognorhynchus icterotisScarlet-fronted parakeet, Psittacara wagleriRed-masked parakeet, Psittacara erythrogenysWhite-eyed parakeet, Psittacara leucophthalmusSapayoa
Order: PasseriformesFamily: Sapayoidae

The sapayoa is the only member of its family, and is found in the lowland rainforests of Panama and north-western South America. It is usually seen in pairs or mixed-species flocks.

Sapayoa, Sapayoa aenigmaAntbirds
Order: PasseriformesFamily: Thamnophilidae

The antbirds are a large family of small passerine birds of subtropical and tropical Central and South America. They are forest birds which tend to feed on insects at or near the ground. A sizable minority of them specialize in following columns of army ants to eat small invertebrates that leave their hiding places to flee from the ants. Many species lack bright color, with brown, black, and white being the dominant tones. Ninety-five species have been recorded in Ecuador.

Rufous-rumped antwren, Euchrepomis callinotaChestnut-shouldered antwren, Euchrepomis humeralisAsh-winged antwren, Euchrepomis spodioptilaFasciated antshrike, Cymbilaimus lineatusFulvous antshrike, Frederickena fulvaGreat antshrike, Taraba majorBarred antshrike, Thamnophilus doliatusChapman's antshrike, Thamnophilus zarumaeLined antshrike, Thamnophilus tenuepunctatusCollared antshrike, Thamnophilus bernardiBlack-crowned antshrike, Thamnophilus atrinuchaPlain-winged antshrike, Thamnophilus schistaceusMouse-colored antshrike, Thamnophilus murinusCocha antshrike, Thamnophilus praecoxCastelnau's antshrike, Thamnophilus cryptoleucusNorthern slaty-antshrike, Thamnophilus punctatusUniform antshrike, Thamnophilus unicolorWhite-shouldered antshrike, Thamnophilus aethiopsAmazonian antshrike, Thamnophilus amazonicusPearly antshrike, Megastictus margaritatusBlack bushbird, Neoctantes nigerRusset antshrike, Thamnistes anabatinusRufescent antshrike, Thamnistes rufescensPlain antvireo, Dysithamnus mentalisSpot-crowned antvireo, Dysithamnus puncticepsBicolored antvireo, Dysithamnus occidentalisWhite-streaked antvireo, Dysithamnus leucostictusDusky-throated antshrike, Thamnomanes ardesiacusCinereous antshrike, Thamnomanes caesiusPlain-throated antwren, Isleria hauxwelliSpot-winged antshrike, Pygiptila stellarisChecker-throated stipplethroat, Epinecrophylla fulviventrisOrnate stipplethroat, Epinecrophylla ornataRufous-tailed stipplethroat, Epinecrophylla erythruraRufous-backed stipplethroat, Epinecrophylla haematonotaFoothill stipplethroat, Epinecrophylla spodionotaPygmy antwren, Myrmotherula brachyuraMoustached antwren, Myrmotherula ignotaAmazonian streaked-antwren, Myrmotherula multostriataPacific antwren, Myrmotherula pacificaStripe-chested antwren, Myrmotherula longicaudaWhite-flanked antwren, Myrmotherula axillarisSlaty antwren, Myrmotherula schisticolorRio Suno antwren, Myrmotherula sunensisLong-winged antwren, Myrmotherula longipennisPlain-winged antwren, Myrmotherula behniGray antwren, Myrmotherula menetriesiiBanded antbird, Dichrozona cinctaDugand's antwren, Herpsilochmus dugandiAncient antwren, Herpsilochmus gentryiYellow-breasted antwren, Herpsilochmus axillarisRufous-margined antwren, Herpsilochmus fraterDot-winged antwren, Microrhopias quixensisStriated antbird, Drymophila devilleiStreak-headed antbird, Drymophila striaticepsPeruvian warbling-antbird, Hypocnemis peruvianaYellow-browed antbird, Hypocnemis hypoxanthaDusky antbird, Cercomacroides tyranninaBlack antbird, Cercomacroides servaBlackish antbird, Cercomacroides nigrescensRiparian antbird, Cercomacroides fuscicaudaGray antbird, Cercomacra cinerascensJet antbird, Cercomacra nigricansWestern fire-eye, Pyriglena mauraWhite-browed antbird, Myrmoborus leucophrysAsh-breasted antbird, Myrmoborus lugubrisBlack-faced antbird, Myrmoborus myotherinusBlack-chinned antbird, Hypocnemoides melanopogonBlack-and-white antbird, Myrmochanes hemileucusSilvered antbird, Sclateria naeviaSlate-colored antbird, Myrmelastes schistaceusPlumbeous antbird, Myrmelastes hyperythrusSpot-winged antbird, Myrmelastes leucostigmaChestnut-backed antbird, Poliocrania exsulGray-headed antbird, Ampelornis griseicepsEsmeraldas antbird, Sipia nigricaudaStub-tailed antbird, Sipia berlepschiZimmer's antbird, Sciaphylax castaneaWhite-shouldered antbird, Akletos melanocepsSooty antbird, Hafferia fortisZeledon's antbird, Hafferia zeledoniBlack-throated antbird, Myrmophylax atrothoraxWing-banded antbird, Myrmornis torquataWhite-plumed antbird, Pithys albifronsBicolored antbird, Gymnopithys bicolorWhite-cheeked antbird, Gymnopithys leucaspisLunulated antbird, Oneillornis lunulatusHairy-crested antbird, Rhegmatorhina melanostictaSpotted antbird, Hylophylax naevioidesSpot-backed antbird, Hylophylax naeviusDot-backed antbird, Hylophylax punctulatusCommon scale-backed antbird, Willisornis poecilinotusBlack-spotted bare-eye, Phlegopsis nigromaculataReddish-winged bare-eye, Phlegopsis erythropteraOcellated antbird, Phaenostictus mcleannaniCrescentchests
Order: PasseriformesFamily: Melanopareiidae

These are smallish birds which inhabit regions of arid scrub. They have a band across the chest which gives them their name.

Marañon crescentchest, Melanopareia maranonicaElegant crescentchest, Melanopareia elegansGnateaters
Order: PasseriformesFamily: Conopophagidae

The gnateaters are round, short-tailed, and long-legged birds which are closely related to the antbirds. Four species have been recorded in Ecuador.

Rufous-crowned antpitta, Pittasoma rufopileatumChestnut-belted gnateater, Conopophaga auritaAsh-throated gnateater, Conopophaga peruvianaChestnut-crowned gnateater, Conopophaga castaneicepsAntpittas
Order: PasseriformesFamily: Grallariidae

Antpittas resemble the true pittas with strong, longish legs, very short tails, and stout bills. Twenty-four species have been recorded in Ecuador.

Undulated antpitta, Grallaria squamigeraGiant antpitta, Grallaria giganteaMoustached antpitta, Grallaria alleniScaled antpitta, Grallaria guatimalensisPlain-backed antpitta, Grallaria haplonotaOchre-striped antpitta, Grallaria dignissimaChestnut-crowned antpitta, Grallaria ruficapillaWatkins's antpitta, Grallaria watkinsiBicolored antpitta, Grallaria rufocinereaJocotoco antpitta, Grallaria ridgelyiChestnut-naped antpitta, Grallaria nuchalisYellow-breasted antpitta, Grallaria flavotinctaWhite-bellied antpitta, Grallaria hypoleucaBicolored antpitta, Grallaria rufocinereaEquatorial antpitta, Grallaria saturataTawny antpitta, Grallaria quitensisOchre-breasted antpitta, Grallaricula flavirostrisCrescent-faced antpitta, Grallaricula lineifronsLeymebamba antpitta, Grallaricula leymebambaePeruvian antpitta, Grallaricula peruvianaSlate-crowned antpitta, Grallaricula nanaStreak-chested antpitta, Hylopezus perspicillatusWhite-lored antpitta, Myrmothera fulviventrisThrush-like antpitta, Myrmothera campanisonaTapaculos
Order: PasseriformesFamily: Rhinocryptidae

The tapaculos are small suboscine passeriform birds with numerous species in South and Central America. They are terrestrial species that fly only poorly on their short wings. They have strong legs, well-suited to their habitat of grassland or forest undergrowth. The tail is cocked and pointed towards the head. Thirteen species have been recorded in Ecuador.

Rusty-belted tapaculo, Liosceles thoracicusOcellated tapaculo, Acropternis orthonyxAsh-colored tapaculo, Myornis senilisBlackish tapaculo, Scytalopus latransLong-tailed tapaculo, Scytalopus micropterusWhite-crowned tapaculo, Scytalopus atratusChoco tapaculo, Scytalopus chocoensisEcuadorian tapaculo, Scytalopus robbinsi (EM)
Nariño tapaculo, Scytalopus viciniorSpillmann's tapaculo, Scytalopus spillmanniChusquea tapaculo, Scytalopus parkeriParamo tapaculo, Scytalopus opacusLoja tapaculo, Scytalopus androstictusAntthrushes
Order: PasseriformesFamily: Formicariidae

Antthrushes resemble small rails with strong, longish legs, very short tails, and stout bills. Seven species have been recorded in Ecuador.

Rufous-capped antthrush, Formicarius colmaBlack-faced antthrush, Formicarius analisBlack-headed antthrush, Formicarius nigricapillusRufous-breasted antthrush, Formicarius rufipectusShort-tailed antthrush, Chamaeza campanisonaStriated antthrush, Chamaeza nobilisBarred antthrush, Chamaeza mollissimaOvenbirds
Order: PasseriformesFamily: Furnariidae

Ovenbirds comprise a large family of small sub-oscine passerine bird species found in Central and South America. They are a diverse group of insectivores which gets its name from the elaborate "oven-like" clay nests built by some species, although others build stick nests or nest in tunnels or clefts in rock. The woodcreepers are brownish birds which maintain an upright vertical posture, supported by their stiff tail vanes. They feed mainly on insects taken from tree trunks. One hundred six species have been recorded in Ecuador.

South American leaftosser, Sclerurus obscuriorShort-billed leaftosser, Sclerurus rufigularisScaly-throated leaftosser, Sclerurus guatemalensisBlack-tailed leaftosser, Sclerurus caudacutusGray-throated leaftosser, Sclerurus albigularisSlender-billed miner, Geositta tenuirostrisSpot-throated woodcreeper, Certhiasomus stictolaemusOlivaceous woodcreeper, Sittasomus griseicapillusLong-tailed woodcreeper, Deconychura longicaudaTyrannine woodcreeper, Dendrocincla tyranninaWhite-chinned woodcreeper, Dendrocincla merulaPlain-brown woodcreeper, Dendrocincla fuliginosaWedge-billed woodcreeper, Glyphorynchus spirurusCinnamon-throated woodcreeper, Dendrexetastes rufigulaLong-billed woodcreeper, Nasica longirostrisNorthern barred-woodcreeper, Dendrocolaptes sanctithomaeAmazonian barred-woodcreeper, Dendrocolaptes certhiaBlack-banded woodcreeper, Dendrocolaptes picumnusBar-bellied woodcreeper, Hylexetastes stresemanniStrong-billed woodcreeper, Xiphocolaptes promeropirhynchusStriped woodcreeper, Xiphorhynchus obsoletusOcellated woodcreeper, Xiphorhynchus ocellatusElegant woodcreeper, Xiphorhynchus elegansBuff-throated woodcreeper, Xiphorhynchus guttatusBlack-striped woodcreeper, Xiphorhynchus lachrymosusSpotted woodcreeper, Xiphorhynchus erythropygiusOlive-backed woodcreeper, Xiphorhynchus triangularisStraight-billed woodcreeper, Dendroplex picusRed-billed scythebill, Campylorhamphus trochilirostrisCurve-billed scythebill, Campylorhamphus procurvoidesBrown-billed scythebill, Campylorhamphus pusillusGreater scythebill, Drymotoxeres pucheraniiStreak-headed woodcreeper, Lepidocolaptes souleyetiiMontane woodcreeper, Lepidocolaptes lacrymigerDuida woodcreeper, Lepidocolaptes duidaeSlender-billed xenops, Xenops tenuirostrisPlain xenops, Xenops minutusStreaked xenops, Xenops rutilansPoint-tailed palmcreeper, Berlepschia rikeriRufous-tailed xenops, Microxenops milleriPacific tuftedcheek, Pseudocolaptes johnsoniStreaked tuftedcheek, Pseudocolaptes boissonneautiiRusty-winged barbtail, Premnornis guttuligerPale-legged hornero, Furnarius leucopusPale-billed hornero, Furnarius torridus (H)
Lesser hornero, Furnarius minorSharp-tailed streamcreeper, Lochmias nematuraChestnut-winged cinclodes, Cinclodes albidiventrisStout-billed cinclodes, Cinclodes excelsiorDusky-cheeked foliage-gleaner, Anabazenops dorsalisSlaty-winged foliage-gleaner, Philydor fuscipenneRufous-rumped foliage-gleaner, Philydor erythrocercumCinnamon-rumped foliage-gleaner, Philydor pyrrhodesMontane foliage-gleaner, Anabacerthia striaticollisScaly-throated foliage-gleaner, Anabacerthia variegaticepsRufous-tailed foliage-gleaner, Anabacerthia ruficaudataBuff-browed foliage-gleaner, Syndactyla rufosuperciliataLineated foliage-gleaner, Syndactyla subalarisRufous-necked foliage-gleaner, Syndactyla ruficollisChestnut-winged hookbill, Ancistrops strigilatusBuff-fronted foliage-gleaner, Dendroma rufaChestnut-winged foliage-gleaner, Dendroma erythropteraHenna-hooded foliage-gleaner, Clibanornis erythrocephalusRuddy foliage-gleaner, Clibanornis rubiginosusUniform treehunter, Thripadectes ignobilisFlammulated treehunter, Thripadectes flammulatusStriped treehunter, Thripadectes holostictusStreak-capped treehunter, Thripadectes virgaticepsBlack-billed treehunter, Thripadectes melanorhynchusChestnut-crowned foliage-gleaner, Automolus rufipileatusBrown-rumped foliage-gleaner, Automolus melanopezusBuff-throated foliage-gleaner, Automolus ochrolaemusStriped woodhaunter, Automolus subulatusOlive-backed foliage-gleaner, Automolus infuscatusSpotted barbtail, Premnoplex brunnescensFulvous-dotted treerunner, Margarornis stellatusPearled treerunner, Margarornis squamigerAndean tit-spinetail, Leptasthenura andicolaRufous-fronted thornbird, Phacellodomus rufifronsWhite-browed spinetail, Hellmayrea gularisMany-striped canastero, Asthenes flammulataStreak-backed canastero, Asthenes wyattiWhite-chinned thistletail, Asthenes fuliginosaMouse-colored thistletail, Asthenes griseomurinaOrange-fronted plushcrown, Metopothrix aurantiacaDouble-banded graytail, Xenerpestes minlosiEquatorial graytail, Xenerpestes singularisSpectacled prickletail, Siptornis striaticollisPlain softtail, Thripophaga fuscicepsParker's spinetail, Cranioleuca vulpeculaRed-faced spinetail, Cranioleuca erythropsAsh-browed spinetail, Cranioleuca curtataLine-cheeked spinetail, Cranioleuca antisiensisSpeckled spinetail, Cranioleuca gutturataWhite-bellied spinetail, Mazaria propinquaPlain-crowned spinetail, Synallaxis gujanensisMarañon spinetail, Synallaxis maranonicaNecklaced spinetail, Synallaxis stictothoraxSlaty spinetail, Synallaxis brachyuraDusky spinetail, Synallaxis moestaDark-breasted spinetail, Synallaxis albigularisAzara's spinetail, Synallaxis azaraeBlackish-headed spinetail, Synallaxis tithysRufous spinetail, Synallaxis unirufaRuddy spinetail, Synallaxis rutilansChestnut-throated spinetail, Synallaxis cherrieiManakins
Order: PasseriformesFamily: Pipridae

The manakins are a family of subtropical and tropical mainland Central and South America and Trinidad and Tobago. They are compact forest birds, the males typically being brightly colored, although the females of most species are duller and usually green-plumaged. Manakins feed on small fruits, berries, and insects.  Seventeen species have been recorded in Ecuador.

Dwarf tyrant-manakin, Tyranneutes stolzmanniYellow-headed manakin, Chloropipo flavicapillaJet manakin, Chloropipo unicolorBlue-backed manakin, Chiroxiphia pareolaGolden-winged manakin, Masius chrysopterusGreen manakin, Cryptopipo holochloraVelvety manakin,  Lepidothrix velutinaBlue-capped manakin, Lepidothrix coronataBlue-rumped manakin, Lepidothrix isidoreiOrange-crowned manakin, Heterocercus aurantiivertexWhite-bearded manakin, Manacus manacusWire-tailed manakin, Pipra filicaudaClub-winged manakin, Machaeropterus deliciosusStriolated manakin, Machaeropterus striolatusWhite-crowned manakin, Pseudopipra pipraRed-capped manakin, Ceratopipra mentalisGolden-headed manakin, Ceratopipra erythrocephalaCotingas
Order: PasseriformesFamily: Cotingidae

The cotingas are birds of forests or forest edges in tropical South America. Comparatively little is known about this diverse group, although all have broad bills with hooked tips, rounded wings, and strong legs. The males of many of the species are brightly colored or decorated with plumes or wattles. Twenty-eight species have been recorded in Ecuador.

Green-and-black fruiteater, Pipreola riefferiiBarred fruiteater, Pipreola arcuataOrange-breasted fruiteater, Pipreola jucundaBlack-chested fruiteater, Pipreola lubomirskiiScarlet-breasted fruiteater, Pipreola frontalisFiery-throated fruiteater, Pipreola chlorolepidotaScaled fruiteater, Ampelioides tschudiiChestnut-bellied cotinga, Doliornis remseniRed-crested cotinga, Ampelion rubrocristataChestnut-crested cotinga, Ampelion rufaxillaBlack-necked red-cotinga, Phoenicircus nigricollisAndean cock-of-the-rock, Rupicola peruvianaGray-tailed piha, Snowornis subalarisOlivaceous piha, Snowornis cryptolophusPurple-throated fruitcrow, Querula purpurataRed-ruffed fruitcrow, Pyroderus scutatusAmazonian umbrellabird, Cephalopterus ornatusLong-wattled umbrellabird, Cephalopterus penduligerBlue cotinga, Cotinga nattereriiPlum-throated cotinga, Cotinga maynanaSpangled cotinga, Cotinga cayanaRufous piha, Lipaugus unirufusScreaming piha, Lipaugus vociferansDusky piha, Lipaugus fuscocinereusPurple-throated cotinga, Porphyrolaema porphyrolaemaBlack-tipped cotinga, Carpodectes hopkeiPompadour cotinga, Xipholena puniceaBare-necked fruitcrow, Gymnoderus foetidusTityras
Order: PasseriformesFamily: Tityridae

Tityridae are suboscine passerine birds found in forest and woodland in the Neotropics. The species in this family were formerly spread over the families Tyrannidae, Pipridae, and Cotingidae. They are small to medium-sized birds. They do not have the sophisticated vocal capabilities of the songbirds. Most, but not all, have plain coloring. Twenty-two species have been recorded in Ecuador.

Black-crowned tityra, Tityra inquisitorBlack-tailed tityra, Tityra cayanaMasked tityra, Tityra semifasciataVarzea schiffornis, Schiffornis majorNorthern schiffornis, Schiffornis veraepacisFoothill schiffornis, Schiffornis aeneaBrown-winged schiffornis, Schiffornis turdinaSpeckled mourner, Laniocera rufescensCinereous mourner, Laniocera hypopyrraWhite-browed purpletuft, Iodopleura isabellaeShrike-like cotinga, Laniisoma elegansGreen-backed becard, Pachyramphus viridisBarred becard, Pachyramphus versicolorSlaty becard, Pachyramphus spodiurusCinnamon becard, Pachyramphus cinnamomeusChestnut-crowned becard, Pachyramphus castaneusWhite-winged becard, Pachyramphus polychopterusBlack-and-white becard, Pachyramphus albogriseusBlack-capped becard, Pachyramphus marginatusOne-colored becard, Pachyramphus homochrousPink-throated becard, Pachyramphus minorSharpbill
Order: PasseriformesFamily: Oxyruncidae

The sharpbill is a small bird of dense forests in Central and South America. It feeds mostly on fruit but also eats insects.

Sharpbill, Oxyruncus cristatusRoyal flycatchers
Order: PasseriformesFamily: Onychorhynchidae

In 2019 the SACC determined that these five species, which were formerly considered tyrant flycatchers, belonged in their own family.

Royal flycatcher, Onychorhynchus coronatusRuddy-tailed flycatcher, Terenotriccus erythrurusTawny-breasted flycatcher, Myiobius villosusSulphur-rumped flycatcher, Myiobius barbatusBlack-tailed flycatcher, Myiobius atricaudusTyrant flycatchers
Order: PasseriformesFamily: Tyrannidae

Tyrant flycatchers are passerine birds which occur throughout North and South America. They superficially resemble the Old World flycatchers, but are more robust and have stronger bills. They do not have the sophisticated vocal capabilities of the songbirds. Most, but not all, have plain coloring. As the name implies, most are insectivorous. Two hundred one species have been recorded in Ecuador.

Wing-barred piprites, Piprites chlorisCinnamon manakin-tyrant, Neopipo cinnamomeaCinnamon-crested spadebill, Platyrinchus saturatusWhite-throated spadebill, Platyrinchus mystaceusGolden-crowned spadebill, Platyrinchus coronatusYellow-throated spadebill, Platyrinchus flavigularisWhite-crested spadebill, Platyrinchus platyrhynchosBronze-olive pygmy-tyrant, Pseudotriccus pelzelniRufous-headed pygmy-tyrant, Pseudotriccus ruficepsRinged antpipit, Corythopis torquatusVariegated bristle-tyrant, Phylloscartes poecilotisMarble-faced bristle-tyrant, Phylloscartes ophthalmicusSpectacled bristle-tyrant, Phylloscartes orbitalisEcuadorian tyrannulet, Phylloscartes gualaquizaeRufous-browed tyrannulet, Phylloscartes superciliarisStreak-necked flycatcher, Mionectes striaticollisOlive-striped flycatcher, Mionectes olivaceusOchre-bellied flycatcher, Mionectes oleagineusSepia-capped flycatcher, Leptopogon amaurocephalusSlaty-capped flycatcher, Leptopogon superciliarisRufous-breasted flycatcher, Leptopogon rufipectusBrownish twistwing, Cnipodectes subbrunneusOlivaceous flatbill, Rhynchocyclus olivaceusPacific flatbill, Rhynchocyclus pacificusFulvous-breasted flatbill, Rhynchocyclus fulvipectusYellow-olive flycatcher, Tolmomyias sulphurescensOrange-eyed flycatcher, Tolmomyias trayloriYellow-margined flycatcher, Tolmomyias assimilisGray-crowned flycatcher, Tolmomyias poliocephalusYellow-breasted flycatcher, Tolmomyias flaviventrisWhite-bellied pygmy-tyrant, Myiornis albiventrisBlack-capped pygmy-tyrant, Myiornis atricapillusShort-tailed pygmy-tyrant, Myiornis ecaudatusScale-crested pygmy-tyrant, Lophotriccus pileatusDouble-banded pygmy-tyrant, Lophotriccus vitiosusWhite-eyed tody-tyrant, Hemitriccus zosteropsJohannes's tody-tyrant, Hemitriccus iohannisZimmer's tody-tyrant, Hemitriccus minimusBlack-throated tody-tyrant, Hemitriccus granadensisCinnamon-breasted tody-tyrant, Hemitriccus cinnamomeipectusBuff-throated tody-tyrant, Hemitriccus rufigularisRufous-crowned tody-flycatcher, Poecilotriccus ruficepsBlack-and-white tody-flycatcher, Poecilotriccus capitalisRusty-fronted tody-flycatcher, Poecilotriccus latirostrisGolden-winged tody-flycatcher, Poecilotriccus calopterusSpotted tody-flycatcher, Todirostrum maculatumCommon tody-flycatcher, Todirostrum cinereumBlack-headed tody-flycatcher, Todirostrum nigricepsYellow-browed tody-flycatcher, Todirostrum chrysocrotaphumOrnate flycatcher, Myiotriccus ornatusHandsome flycatcher, Nephelomyias pulcherOrange-banded flycatcher, Nephelomyias lintoniCliff flycatcher, Hirundinea ferrugineaCinnamon flycatcher, Pyrrhomyias cinnamomeusChoco tyrannulet, Zimmerius albigularisRed-billed tyrannulet, Zimmerius cinereicapillaSlender-footed tyrannulet, Zimmerius gracilipesGolden-faced tyrannulet, Zimmerius chrysopsPeruvian tyrannulet, Zimmerius viridiflavusLesser wagtail-tyrant, Stigmatura napensisFulvous-faced scrub-tyrant, Euscarthmus fulvicepsBrown-capped tyrannulet, Ornithion brunneicapillusWhite-lored tyrannulet, Ornithion inermeSouthern beardless-tyrannulet, Camptostoma obsoletumYellow-bellied elaenia, Elaenia flavogasterLarge elaenia, Elaenia spectabilisWhite-crested elaenia, Elaenia albicepsSmall-billed elaenia, Elaenia parvirostrisSlaty elaenia, Elaenia strepera (V)
Mottle-backed elaenia, Elaenia gigasLesser elaenia, Elaenia chiriquensisCoopmans's elaenia, Elaenia brachypteraHighland elaenia, Elaenia obscuraSierran elaenia, Elaenia pallatangaeYellow-crowned tyrannulet, Tyrannulus elatusForest elaenia, Myiopagis gaimardiiGray elaenia, Myiopagis canicepsFoothill elaenia, Myiopagis olallaiPacific elaenia, Myiopagis subplacensYellow-crowned elaenia, Myiopagis flavivertexGreenish elaenia, Myiopagis viridicataYellow tyrannulet, Capsiempis flaveolaRough-legged tyrannulet, Phyllomyias burmeisteriSooty-headed tyrannulet, Phyllomyias griseicepsBlack-capped tyrannulet, Phyllomyias nigrocapillusAshy-headed tyrannulet, Phyllomyias cinereicepsTawny-rumped tyrannulet, Phyllomyias uropygialisPlumbeous-crowned tyrannulet, Phyllomyias plumbeicepsMouse-colored tyrannulet, Phaeomyias murinaGray-and-white tyrannulet, Pseudelaenia leucospodiaWhite-tailed tyrannulet, Mecocerculus poecilocercusWhite-banded tyrannulet, Mecocerculus stictopterusWhite-throated tyrannulet, Mecocerculus leucophrysRufous-winged tyrannulet, Mecocerculus calopterusSulphur-bellied tyrannulet, Mecocerculus minorBlack-crested tit-tyrant, Anairetes nigrocristatusTufted tit-tyrant, Anairetes parulusSubtropical doradito, Pseudocolopteryx acutipennisTorrent tyrannulet, Serpophaga cinereaRiver tyrannulet, Serpophaga hypoleucaAgile tit-tyrant, Uromyias agilisShort-tailed field tyrant, Muscigralla brevicaudaCinnamon attila, Attila cinnamomeusOchraceous attila, Attila torridusCitron-bellied attila, Attila citriniventrisBright-rumped attila, Attila spadiceusPiratic flycatcher, Legatus leucophaiusLarge-headed flatbill, Ramphotrigon megacephalumRufous-tailed flatbill, Ramphotrigon ruficaudaDusky-tailed flatbill, Ramphotrigon fuscicaudaGreat kiskadee, Pitangus sulphuratusLesser kiskadee, Philohydor lictorCattle tyrant, Machetornis rixosaSulphury flycatcher, Tyrannopsis sulphureaBoat-billed flycatcher, Megarynchus pitanguaGolden-crowned flycatcher, Myiodynastes chrysocephalusBaird's flycatcher, Myiodynastes bairdiiSulphur-bellied flycatcher, Myiodynastes luteiventrisStreaked flycatcher, Myiodynastes maculatusRusty-margined flycatcher, Myiozetetes cayanensisSocial flycatcher, Myiozetetes similisGray-capped flycatcher, Myiozetetes granadensisDusky-chested flycatcher, Myiozetetes luteiventrisWhite-ringed flycatcher, Conopias albovittatusYellow-throated flycatcher, Conopias parvusThree-striped flycatcher, Conopias trivirgatusLemon-browed flycatcher, Conopias cinchonetiVariegated flycatcher, Empidonomus variusCrowned slaty flycatcher, Empidonomus aurantioatrocristatusSnowy-throated kingbird, Tyrannus niveigularisWhite-throated kingbird, Tyrannus albogularisTropical kingbird, Tyrannus melancholicusFork-tailed flycatcher, Tyrannus savanaEastern kingbird, Tyrannus tyrannusGray kingbird, Tyrannus dominicensis (V)
Rufous mourner, Rhytipterna holerythraGrayish mourner, Rhytipterna simplexChoco sirystes, Sirystes albogriseusWhite-rumped sirystes, Sirystes albocinereusDusky-capped flycatcher, Myiarchus tuberculiferSwainson's flycatcher, Myiarchus swainsoniPanama flycatcher, Myiarchus panamensisShort-crested flycatcher, Myiarchus feroxSooty-crowned flycatcher, Myiarchus phaeocephalusPale-edged flycatcher, Myiarchus cephalotesGreat crested flycatcher, Myiarchus crinitusBrown-crested flycatcher, Myiarchus tyrannulus (H)
Galapagos flycatcher, Myiarchus magnirostris (EG)
Long-tailed tyrant, Colonia colonusFlavescent flycatcher, Myiophobus flavicansOrange-crested flycatcher, Myiophobus phoenicomitraRoraiman flycatcher, Myiophobus roraimaeOlive-chested flycatcher, Myiophobus cryptoxanthusBran-colored flycatcher, Myiophobus fasciatusCrowned chat-tyrant, Ochthoeca frontalisJelski's chat-tyrant, Ochthoeca jelskiiYellow-bellied chat-tyrant, Ochthoeca diademaSlaty-backed chat-tyrant, Ochthoeca cinnamomeiventrisRufous-breasted chat-tyrant, Ochthoeca rufipectoralisBrown-backed chat-tyrant, Ochthoeca fumicolorWhite-browed chat-tyrant, Ochthoeca leucophrysTumbes tyrant, Tumbezia salviniAmazonian scrub-flycatcher, Sublegatus obscuriorSouthern scrub-flycatcher, Sublegatus modestus (V)
Vermilion flycatcher, Pyrocephalus rubinusBrujo flycatcher, Pyrocephalus nanus (EG)
Pied water-tyrant, Fluvicola pica (V)
Masked water-tyrant, Fluvicola nengetaWhite-headed marsh tyrant, Arundinicola leucocephala (H)
Riverside tyrant, Knipolegus orenocensisRufous-tailed tyrant, Knipolegus poecilurusAmazonian black-tyrant, Knipolegus poecilocercusJelski's black-tyrant, Knipolegus signatusLittle ground-tyrant, Muscisaxicola fluviatilis (V)
Spot-billed ground-tyrant, Muscisaxicola maculirostrisDark-faced ground-tyrant, Muscisaxicola maclovianus (H)
White-browed ground-tyrant, Muscisaxicola albiloraPlain-capped ground-tyrant, Muscisaxicola alpinusRed-rumped bush-tyrant, Cnemarchus erythropygiusBlack-billed shrike-tyrant, Agriornis montanusWhite-tailed shrike-tyrant, Agriornis albicaudaStreak-throated bush-tyrant, Myiotheretes striaticollisSmoky bush-tyrant, Myiotheretes fumigatusDrab water tyrant, Ochthornis littoralisFuscous flycatcher, Cnemotriccus fuscatusEuler's flycatcher, Lathrotriccus euleriGray-breasted flycatcher, Lathrotriccus griseipectusTufted flycatcher, Mitrephanes phaeocercusBlack phoebe, Sayornis nigricansAcadian flycatcher, Empidonax virescensWillow flycatcher, Empidonax trailliiAlder flycatcher, Empidonax alnorumOlive-sided flycatcher, Contopus cooperiSmoke-colored pewee, Contopus fumigatusWestern wood-pewee, Contopus sordidulusEastern wood-pewee, Contopus virensTropical pewee, Contopus cinereusBlackish pewee, Contopus nigrescensVireos
Order: PasseriformesFamily: Vireonidae

The vireos are a group of small to medium-sized passerine birds. They are typically greenish in color and resemble wood warblers apart from their heavier bills. Sixteen species have been recorded in Ecuador.

Rufous-browed peppershrike, Cyclarhis gujanensisBlack-billed peppershrike, Cyclarhis nigrirostrisOlivaceous greenlet, Hylophilus olivaceusLemon-chested greenlet, Hylophilus thoracicusSlaty-capped shrike-vireo, Vireolanius leucotisTawny-crowned greenlet, Tunchiornis ochraceicepsLesser greenlet, Pachysylvia decurtataDusky-capped greenlet, Pachysylvia hypoxanthaRufous-naped greenlet, Pachysylvia semibrunneaYellow-throated vireo, Vireo flavifrons (V)
Choco vireo, Vireo masteriPhiladelphia vireo, Vireo philadelphicus (V)
Warbling vireo, Vireo gilvus (V)
Brown-capped vireo, Vireo leucophrysRed-eyed vireo, Vireo olivaceusChivi vireo, Vireo chiviYellow-green vireo, Vireo flavoviridisJays
Order: PasseriformesFamily: Corvidae

The family Corvidae includes crows, ravens, jays, choughs, magpies, treepies, nutcrackers, and ground jays. Corvids are above average in size for the Passeriformes. Some of the larger species show high levels of intelligence. Six species have been recorded in Ecuador.

Black-collared jay, Cyanolyca armillataTurquoise jay, Cyanolyca turcosaBeautiful jay, Cyanolyca pulchraViolaceous jay, Cyanocorax violaceusWhite-tailed jay, Cyanocorax mystacalisGreen jay, Cyanocorax yncasSwallows
Order: PasseriformesFamily: Hirundinidae

The family Hirundinidae is adapted to aerial feeding. They have a slender streamlined body, long pointed wings, and a short bill with a wide gape. The feet are adapted to perching rather than walking, and the front toes are partially joined at the base. Nineteen species have been recorded in Ecuador.

Blue-and-white swallow, Pygochelidon cyanoleucaBrown-bellied swallow, Orochelidon murinaPale-footed swallow, Orochelidon flavipesWhite-banded swallow, Atticora fasciataWhite-thighed swallow, Atticora tibialisSouthern rough-winged swallow, Stelgidopteryx ruficollisBrown-chested martin, Progne taperaPurple martin, Progne subisGray-breasted martin, Progne chalybeaSouthern martin, Progne elegansGalapagos martin, Progne modesta (EG)
Tree swallow, Tachycineta bicolor (H)
Tumbes swallow, Tachycineta stolzmanniWhite-winged swallow, Tachycineta albiventerWhite-rumped swallow, Tachycineta leucorrhoa (H)
Bank swallow, Riparia ripariaBarn swallow, Hirundo rusticaCliff swallow, Petrochelidon pyrrhonotaChestnut-collared swallow, Petrochelidon rufocollarisWrens
Order: PasseriformesFamily: Troglodytidae

The wrens are mainly small and inconspicuous except for their loud songs. These birds have short wings and thin down-turned bills. Several species often hold their tails upright. All are insectivorous. Twenty-five species have been recorded in Ecuador.

Scaly-breasted wren, Microcerculus marginatusWing-banded wren, Microcerculus bamblaGray-mantled wren, Odontorchilus branickiiHouse wren, Troglodytes aedonMountain wren, Troglodytes solstitialisGrass wren, Cistothorus platensisBand-backed wren, Campylorhynchus zonatusFasciated wren, Campylorhynchus fasciatusThrush-like wren, Campylorhynchus turdinusPlain-tailed wren, Pheugopedius euophrysWhiskered wren, Pheugopedius mystacalisCoraya wren, Pheugopedius corayaSpeckle-breasted wren, Pheugopedius sclateriStripe-throated wren, Cantorchilus leucopogonBay wren, Cantorchilus nigricapillusSuperciliated wren, Cantorchilus superciliarisBuff-breasted wren, Cantorchilus leucotisRufous wren, Cinnycerthia unirufaSharpe's wren, Cinnycerthia olivascensWhite-breasted wood-wren, Henicorhina leucostictaBar-winged wood-wren, Henicorhina leucopteraGray-breasted wood-wren, Henicorhina leucophrysChestnut-breasted wren, Cyphorhinus thoracicusSong wren, Cyphorhinus phaeocephalusMusician wren, Cyphorhinus aradusGnatcatchers
Order: PasseriformesFamily: Polioptilidae

These dainty birds resemble Old World warblers in their build and habits, moving restlessly through the foliage seeking insects. The gnatcatchers and gnatwrens are mainly soft bluish gray in color and have the typical insectivore's long sharp bill. They are birds of fairly open woodland or scrub which nest in bushes or trees. Five species have been recorded in Ecuador.

Collared gnatwren, Microbates collarisHalf-collared gnatwren, Microbates cinereiventrisTrilling gnatwren, Ramphocaenus melanurusTropical gnatcatcher, Polioptila plumbeaSlate-throated gnatcatcher, Polioptila schistaceigulaDonacobius
Order: PasseriformesFamily: Donacobiidae

The black-capped donacobius is found in wet habitats from Panama across northern South America and east of the Andes to Argentina and Paraguay.

Black-capped donacobius, Donacobius atricapillaDippers
Order: PasseriformesFamily: Cinclidae

Dippers are a group of perching birds whose habitat includes aquatic environments in the Americas, Europe and Asia. They are named for their bobbing or dipping movements. One species has been recorded in Ecuador.

White-capped dipper, Cinclus leucocephalusWaxwings
Order: PasseriformesFamily: Bombycillidae

The waxwings are a group of birds with soft silky plumage and unique red tips to some of the wing feathers. In the Bohemian and cedar waxwings, these tips look like sealing wax and give the group its name. These are arboreal birds of northern forests. They live on insects in summer and berries in winter. One species has been recorded in Ecuador.

Cedar waxwing, Bombycilla cedrorum (H)

Thrushes
Order: PasseriformesFamily: Turdidae

The thrushes are a group of passerine birds that occur mainly in the Old World. They are plump, soft plumaged, small to medium-sized insectivores or sometimes omnivores, often feeding on the ground. Many have attractive songs. Twenty-two species have been recorded in Ecuador.

Andean solitaire, Myadestes ralloidesSlaty-backed nightingale-thrush, Catharus fuscaterSpeckled nightingale thrush, Catharus maculatusGray-cheeked thrush, Catharus minimusSwainson's thrush, Catharus ustulatusBlack solitaire, Entomodestes coracinusRufous-brown solitaire, Cichlopsis leucogenysPale-eyed thrush, Turdus leucopsPlumbeous-backed thrush, Turdus reeveiHauxwell's thrush, Turdus hauxwelliPale-vented thrush, Turdus obsoletusEcuadorian thrush, Turdus maculirostrisLawrence's thrush, Turdus lawrenciiBlack-billed thrush, Turdus ignobilisMarañon thrush, Turdus maranonicusChestnut-bellied thrush, Turdus fulviventrisAndean slaty thrush, Turdus nigricepsGreat thrush, Turdus fuscaterChiguanco thrush, Turdus chiguancoGlossy-black thrush, Turdus serranusWhite-throated thrush, Turdus assimilisWhite-necked thrush, Turdus albicollisMockingbirds
Order: PasseriformesFamily: Mimidae

The mimids are a family of passerine birds that includes thrashers, mockingbirds, tremblers, and the New World catbirds. These birds are notable for their vocalizations, especially their ability to mimic a wide variety of birds and other sounds heard outdoors. Their coloring tends towards dull-greys and browns. Six species have been recorded in Ecuador.

Tropical mockingbird, Mimus gilvusLong-tailed mockingbird, Mimus longicaudatusGalapagos mockingbird, Mimus parvulus (EG)
Floreana mockingbird, Mimus trifasciatus (EG)
Española mockingbird, Mimus macdonaldi (EG)
San Cristobal mockingbird, Mimus melanotis (EG)

Estreldids
Order: PasseriformesFamily: Estrildidae

The estrildid finches are small passerine birds of the Old World tropics and Australasia. They are gregarious and often colonial seed eaters with short thick but pointed bills. They are all similar in structure and habits, but have wide variation in plumage colors and patterns. One species has been recorded in Ecuador

Tricolored munia, Lonchura malacca (I)

Old World sparrows
Order: PasseriformesFamily: Passeridae

Sparrows are small passerine birds. In general, sparrows tend to be small, plump, brown or grey birds with short tails and short powerful beaks. Sparrows are seed eaters, but they also consume small insects. One species has been recorded in Ecuador.

House sparrow, Passer domesticus (I)

Pipits and wagtails
Order: PasseriformesFamily: Motacillidae

Motacillidae is a family of small passerine birds with medium to long tails. They include the wagtails, longclaws and pipits. They are slender, ground feeding insectivores of open country. Two species have been recorded in Ecuador.

Red-throated pipit, Anthus cervinus (V)
Paramo pipit, Anthus bogotensisFinches
Order: PasseriformesFamily: Fringillidae

Finches are seed-eating passerine birds that are small to moderately large and have a strong beak, usually conical and in some species very large. All have twelve tail feathers and nine primaries. These birds have a bouncing flight with alternating bouts of flapping and gliding on closed wings, and most sing well. Nineteen species have been recorded in Ecuador.

Andean siskin, Spinus spinescensHooded siskin, Spinus magellanicusSaffron siskin, Spinus siemiradzkiiOlivaceous siskin, Spinus olivaceusYellow-bellied siskin, Spinus xanthogastrusLesser goldfinch, Spinus psaltriaGolden-rumped euphonia, Chlorophonia cyanocephalaBlue-naped chlorophonia, Chlorophonia cyaneaChestnut-breasted chlorophonia, Chlorophonia pyrrhophrysYellow-collared chlorophonia, Chlorophonia flavirostrisOrange-crowned euphonia, Euphonia saturataPurple-throated euphonia, Euphonia chloroticaGolden-bellied euphonia, Euphonia chrysopastaWhite-vented euphonia, Euphonia minutaThick-billed euphonia, Euphonia laniirostrisFulvous-vented euphonia, Euphonia fulvicrissaOrange-bellied euphonia, Euphonia xanthogasterBronze-green euphonia, Euphonia mesochrysaRufous-bellied euphonia, Euphonia rufiventrisSparrows
Order: PasseriformesFamily: Passerellidae

Most of the species are known as sparrows, but these birds are not closely related to the Old World sparrows which are in the family Passeridae. Many of these have distinctive head patterns. Twenty-seven species have been recorded in Ecuador.

Tanager finch, Oreothraupis arremonopsYellow-throated chlorospingus, Chlorospingus flavigularisShort-billed chlorospingus, Chlorospingus parvirostrisAshy-throated chlorospingus, Chlorospingus canigularisCommon chlorospingus, Chlorospingus flavopectusDusky chlorospingus, Chlorospingus semifuscusTumbes sparrow, Rhynchospiza stolzmanniGrasshopper sparrow, Ammodramus savannarum (extirpated)
Yellow-browed sparrow, Ammodramus aurifronsBlack-striped sparrow, Arremonops conirostrisGray-browed brushfinch, Arremon assimilisOrange-billed sparrow, Arremon aurantiirostrisBlack-capped sparrow, Arremon abeilleiChestnut-capped brushfinch, Arremon brunneinuchaOlive finch, Arremon castaneicepsRufous-collared sparrow, Zonotrichia capensisWhite-naped brushfinch, Atlapetes albinuchaWhite-rimmed brushfinch, Atlapetes leucopisWhite-headed brushfinch, Atlapetes albicepsTricolored brushfinch, Atlapetes tricolorSlaty brushfinch, Atlapetes schistaceusPale-naped brushfinch, Atlapetes pallidinuchaYellow-breasted brushfinch, Atlapetes latinuchusWhite-winged brushfinch, Atlapetes leucopterusPale-headed brushfinch, Atlapetes pallidiceps (EM)
Bay-crowned brushfinch, Atlapetes seebohmiBlackbirds
Order: PasseriformesFamily: Icteridae

The icterids are a group of small to medium-sized, often colorful, passerine birds restricted to the New World which include the grackles, New World blackbirds, and New World orioles. Most species have black as the predominant plumage color, often enlivened by yellow, orange, or red. Thirty species have been recorded in Ecuador.

Bobolink, Dolichonyx oryzivorus (V)
Red-breasted meadowlark, Leistes militarisPeruvian meadowlark, Leistes bellicosaYellow-billed cacique, Amblycercus holosericeusRusset-backed oropendola, Psarocolius angustifronsGreen oropendola, Psarocolius viridisChestnut-headed oropendola, Psarocolius wagleriCrested oropendola, Psarocolius decumanusOlive oropendola, Psarocolius bifasciatusSolitary black cacique, Cacicus solitariusEcuadorian cacique, Cacicus sclateriScarlet-rumped cacique, Cacicus uropygialisYellow-rumped cacique, Cacicus celaMountain cacique, Cacicus chrysonotusBand-tailed cacique, Cacicus latirostrisRed-rumped cacique, Cacicus haemorrhousCasqued cacique, Cacicus oseryiOrange-backed troupial, Icterus croconotusWhite-edged oriole, Icterus graceannaeYellow-tailed oriole, Icterus mesomelasEpaulet oriole, Icterus cayanensisYellow-backed oriole, Icterus chrysaterBaltimore oriole, Icterus galbula (V)
Giant cowbird, Molothrus oryzivorusShiny cowbird, Molothrus bonariensisScrub blackbird, Dives warczewicziGreat-tailed grackle, Quiscalus mexicanusVelvet-fronted grackle, Lampropsar tanagrinusOriole blackbird, Gymnomystax mexicanusPale-eyed blackbird, Agelasticus xanthophthalmusNew World warblers
Order: PasseriformesFamily: Parulidae

The New World warblers are a group of small, often colorful, passerine birds restricted to the New World. Most are arboreal, but some are terrestrial. Most members of this family are insectivores. Thirty-two species have been recorded in Ecuador.

Ovenbird, Seiurus aurocapilla (V)
Northern waterthrush, Parkesia noveboracensisGolden-winged warbler, Vermivora chrysoptera (V)
Black-and-white warbler, Mniotilta variaProthonotary warbler, Protonotaria citreaTennessee warbler, Oreothlypis peregrinaConnecticut warbler, Oporornis agilis (V)
Masked yellowthroat, Geothlypis aequinoctialisMourning warbler, Geothlypis philadelphiaOlive-crowned yellowthroat, Geothlypis semiflavaAmerican redstart, Setophaga ruticillaCerulean warbler, Setophaga ceruleaTropical parula, Setophaga pitiayumiBay-breasted warbler, Setophaga castaneaBlackburnian warbler, Setophaga fuscaYellow warbler, Setophaga petechiaChestnut-sided warbler, Setophaga pensylvanica (V)
Blackpoll warbler, Setophaga striataBlack-throated blue warbler, Setophaga caerulescens (V)
Black-throated green warbler, Setophaga virens (V)
Citrine warbler, Myiothlypis luteoviridisBlack-crested warbler, Myiothlypis nigrocristataBuff-rumped warbler, Myiothlypis fulvicaudaGolden-bellied warbler, Myiothlypis chrysogasterGray-and-gold warbler, Myiothlypis fraseriRusset-crowned warbler, Myiothlypis coronataThree-striped warbler, Basileuterus tristriatusThree-banded warbler, Basileuterus trifasciatusCanada warbler, Cardellina canadensisWilson's warbler, Cardellina pusilla (V)
Slate-throated redstart, Myioborus miniatusSpectacled redstart, Myioborus melanocephalusMitrospingids
Order: PasseriformesFamily: Mitrospingidae

Until 2017 the four species in this family were included in the family Thraupidae, the "true" tanagers.

Dusky-faced tanager, Mitrospingus cassiniiCardinal grosbeaks
Order: PasseriformesFamily: Cardinalidae

The cardinals are a family of robust seed-eating birds with strong bills. They are typically associated with open woodland. The sexes usually have distinct plumages. Nineteen species have been recorded in Ecuador.

Hepatic tanager, Piranga flavaSummer tanager, Piranga rubraScarlet tanager, Piranga olivaceaWestern tanager, Piranga ludoviciana (V)
Red-hooded tanager, Piranga rubricepsWhite-winged tanager, Piranga leucopteraRed-crowned ant-tanager, Habia rubicaCarmiol's tanager, Chlorothraupis carmioliLemon-spectacled tanager, Chlorothraupis olivaceaOchre-breasted tanager, Chlorothraupis stolzmanniGolden grosbeak, Pheucticus chrysogasterBlack-backed grosbeak, Pheucticus aureoventrisRose-breasted grosbeak, Pheucticus ludovicianusBlue seedeater, Amaurospiza concolorBlue-black grosbeak, Cyanoloxia cyanoidesAmazonian grosbeak, Cyanoloxia rothschildiiBlue grosbeak, Passerina caerulea (V)
Indigo bunting, Passerina cyanea (H)
Dickcissel, Spiza americana (V)

Tanagers
Order: PasseriformesFamily: Thraupidae

The tanagers are a large group of small to medium-sized passerine birds restricted to the New World, mainly in the tropics. Many species are brightly colored. As a family they are omnivorous, but individual species specialize in eating fruits, seeds, insects, or other types of food. Most have short, rounded wings. One hundred seventy-four species have been recorded in Ecuador.

White-capped tanager, Sericossypha albocristataYellow-shouldered grosbeak, Parkerthraustes humeralisPlushcap, Catamblyrhynchus diademaGreen honeycreeper, Chlorophanes spizaGolden-collared honeycreeper, Iridophanes pulcherrimusScarlet-and-white tanager, Chrysothlypis salmoniScarlet-browed tanager, Heterospingus xanthopygiusGuira tanager, Hemithraupis guiraYellow-backed tanager, Hemithraupis flavicollisBicolored conebill, Conirostrum bicolorPearly-breasted conebill, Conirostrum margaritaeChestnut-vented conebill, Conirostrum speciosumGiant conebill, Conirostrum binghamiBlue-backed conebill, Conirostrum sitticolorCapped conebill, Conirostrum albifronsCinereous conebill, Conirostrum cinereumSaffron finch, Sicalis flaveolaGrassland yellow-finch, Sicalis luteolaSulphur-throated finch, Sicalis taczanowskiiPlumbeous sierra finch, Geospizopsis unicolorAsh-breasted sierra finch, Geospizopsis plebejusBand-tailed sierra finch, Rhopospina alaudinaBand-tailed seedeater, Catamenia analisPlain-colored seedeater, Catamenia inornataParamo seedeater, Catamenia homochroaGlossy flowerpiercer, Diglossa lafresnayiiBlack flowerpiercer, Diglossa humeralisWhite-sided flowerpiercer, Diglossa albilateraIndigo flowerpiercer, Diglossa indigoticaRusty flowerpiercer, Diglossa sittoidesDeep-blue flowerpiercer, Diglossa glaucaBluish flowerpiercer, Diglossa caerulescensMasked flowerpiercer, Diglossa cyaneaTit-like dacnis, Xenodacnis parinaSlaty finch, Haplospiza rusticaBlue-black grassquit, Volatinia jacarinaBlack-and-white tanager, Conothraupis speculigeraRufous-crested tanager, Creurgops verticalisFlame-crested tanager, Loriotus cristatusWhite-shouldered tanager, Loriotus luctuosusFulvous-crested tanager, Tachyphonus surinamusTawny-crested tanager, Tachyphonus delatriiWhite-lined tanager, Tachyphonus rufusGray-headed tanager, Eucometis penicillataRed-crested finch, Coryphospingus cucullatusMasked crimson tanager, Ramphocelus nigrogularisSilver-beaked tanager, Ramphocelus carboFlame-rumped tanager, Ramphocelus flammigerusFulvous shrike-tanager, Lanio fulvusCrimson-breasted finch, Rhodospingus cruentusShort-billed honeycreeper, Cyanerpes nitidusPurple honeycreeper, Cyanerpes caeruleusRed-legged honeycreeper, Cyanerpes cyaneusSwallow tanager, Tersina viridisWhite-bellied dacnis, Dacnis albiventrisBlack-faced dacnis, Dacnis lineataYellow-bellied dacnis, Dacnis flaviventerScarlet-thighed dacnis, Dacnis venustaBlue dacnis, Dacnis cayanaScarlet-breasted dacnis, Dacnis berlepschiLesson's seedeater, Sporophila bouvronidesLined seedeater, Sporophila lineolaParrot-billed seedeater, Sporophila peruvianaChestnut-throated seedeater, Sporophila telascoDrab seedeater, Sporophila simplexChestnut-bellied seedeater, Sporophila castaneiventrisRuddy-breasted seedeater, Sporophila minutaThick-billed seed-finch, Sporophila funereaChestnut-bellied seed-finch, Sporophila angolensisLarge-billed seed-finch, Sporophila crassirostrisBlack-billed seed-finch, Sporophila atrirostrisVariable seedeater, Sporophila corvinaGray seedeater, Sporophila intermedia (H)
Wing-barred seedeater, Sporophila americanaBlack-and-white seedeater, Sporophila luctuosaYellow-bellied seedeater, Sporophila nigricollisSlate-colored seedeater, Sporophila schistaceaBuff-throated saltator, Saltator maximusBlack-winged saltator, Saltator atripennisBluish-gray saltator, Saltator coerulescensStreaked saltator, Saltator striatipectusBlack-cowled saltator, Saltator nigricepsMasked saltator, Saltator cinctusSlate-colored grosbeak, Saltator grossusWedge-tailed grass-finch, Emberizoides herbicolaCinereous finch, Piezorina cinerea (H)
Black-headed hemispingus, Pseudospingus verticalisGray-hooded bush tanager, Cnemoscopus rubrirostrisCollared warbling finch, Poospiza hispaniolensisBlack-capped hemispingus, Kleinothraupis atropileusOleaginous hemispingus, Sphenopsis frontalisBlack-eared hemispingus, Sphenopsis melanotisOrange-headed tanager, Thlypopsis sordidaBuff-bellied tanager, Thlypopsis inornataSuperciliaried hemispingus, Thlypopsis superciliarisRufous-chested tanager, Thlypopsis ornataBlack-backed bush tanager, Urothraupis stolzmanniBananaquit, Coereba flaveolaYellow-faced grassquit, Tiaris olivaceusDull-colored grassquit, Asemospiza obscuraGreen warbler-finch, Certhidea olivacea (EG)
Gray warbler-finch, Certhidea fusca (EG)
Vegetarian finch, Platyspiza crassirostris (EG)
Woodpecker finch, Camarhynchus pallidus (EG)
Large tree-finch, Camarhynchus psittacula (EG)
Medium tree-finch, Camarhynchus pauper (EG)
Small tree-finch, Camarhynchus parvulus (EG)
Mangrove finch, Camarhynchus heliobates (EG)
Sharp-beaked ground-finch, Geospiza difficilis (EG)
Vampire ground-finch, Geospiza septentrionalis (EG)
Small ground-finch, Geospiza fuliginosa (EG)
Medium ground-finch, Geospiza fortis (EG)
Genovesa ground-finch, Geospiza acutirostris (EG)
Common cactus-finch, Geospiza scandens (EG)
Genovesa cactus-finch, Geospiza propinqua (EG)
Large ground-finch, Geospiza magnirostris (EG)
Española ground-finch, Geospiza conirostris (EG)
Glistening-green tanager, Chlorochrysa phoenicotisOrange-eared tanager, Chlorochrysa calliparaeaRed-capped cardinal, Paroaria gularisBlack-faced tanager, Schistochlamys melanopisMagpie tanager, Cissopis leverianusVermilion tanager, Calochaetes coccineusPurplish-mantled tanager, Iridosornis porphyrocephalusYellow-throated tanager, Iridosornis analisGolden-crowned tanager, Iridosornis rufivertexFawn-breasted tanager, Pipraeidea melanonotaBlue-and-yellow tanager, Rauenia bonariensisBuff-breasted mountain tanager, Dubusia taeniataLacrimose mountain tanager, Anisognathus lacrymosusScarlet-bellied mountain tanager, Anisognathus igniventrisBlue-winged mountain tanager, Anisognathus somptuosusBlack-chinned mountain tanager, Anisognathus notabilisHooded mountain tanager, Buthraupis montanaMasked mountain tanager, Tephrospilus wetmoreiBlue-capped tanager, Sporathraupis cyanocephalaGrass-green tanager, Chlorornis riefferiiBlack-chested mountain tanager, Cnemathraupis eximiaOrange-throated tanager, Wetmorethraupis sterrhopteronYellow-green tanager, Bangsia flavovirensGolden-chested tanager, Bangsia rothschildiMoss-backed tanager, Bangsia edwardsiGolden-naped tanager, Chalcothraupis ruficervixGray-and-gold tanager, Poecilostreptus palmeriSilvery tanager, Stilpnia viridicollisBlack-capped tanager, Stilpnia heineiGreen-throated tanager, Stilpnia argyrofengesScrub tanager, Stilpnia vitriolinaMasked tanager, Stilpnia nigrocinctaGolden-hooded tanager, Stilpnia larvataBlue-necked tanager, Stilpnia cyanicollisBlue-and-black tanager, Tangara vassoriiBeryl-spangled tanager, Tangara nigroviridisMetallic-green tanager, Tangara labradoridesBlue-browed tanager, Tangara cyanotisTurquoise tanager, Tangara mexicanaParadise tanager, Tangara chilensisOpal-rumped tanager, Tangara veliaOpal-crowned tanager, Tangara callophrysRufous-winged tanager, Tangara laviniaBay-headed tanager, Tangara gyrolaGolden-eared tanager, Tangara chrysotisSaffron-crowned tanager, Tangara xanthocephalaFlame-faced tanager, Tangara parzudakiiGreen-and-gold tanager, Tangara schrankiiBlue-whiskered tanager, Tangara johannaeGolden tanager, Tangara arthusEmerald tanager, Tangara floridaSilver-throated tanager, Tangara icterocephalaBlue-gray tanager, Thraupis episcopusPalm tanager, Thraupis palmarumRufous-throated tanager, Ixothraupis rufigulaSpeckled tanager, Ixothraupis guttataYellow-bellied tanager, Ixothraupis xanthogastraSpotted tanager, Ixothraupis punctata''

Notes

References

See also
List of birds
Lists of birds by region

External links
Birds of Ecuador - World Institute for Conservation & Environment

Ecuador
'
Birds
Ecuador